

566001–566100 

|-bgcolor=#E9E9E9
| 566001 ||  || — || January 18, 2004 || Palomar || NEAT ||  || align=right | 1.6 km || 
|-id=002 bgcolor=#E9E9E9
| 566002 ||  || — || December 8, 2015 || Mount Lemmon || Mount Lemmon Survey ||  || align=right data-sort-value="0.86" | 860 m || 
|-id=003 bgcolor=#E9E9E9
| 566003 ||  || — || October 17, 1995 || Kitt Peak || Spacewatch ||  || align=right | 1.8 km || 
|-id=004 bgcolor=#E9E9E9
| 566004 ||  || — || May 25, 2003 || Kitt Peak || Spacewatch ||  || align=right | 2.6 km || 
|-id=005 bgcolor=#E9E9E9
| 566005 ||  || — || March 23, 2003 || Kitt Peak || Spacewatch ||  || align=right | 1.8 km || 
|-id=006 bgcolor=#E9E9E9
| 566006 ||  || — || November 17, 2010 || Kitt Peak || Spacewatch ||  || align=right | 1.5 km || 
|-id=007 bgcolor=#E9E9E9
| 566007 ||  || — || December 19, 2003 || Kitt Peak || Spacewatch ||  || align=right data-sort-value="0.84" | 840 m || 
|-id=008 bgcolor=#E9E9E9
| 566008 ||  || — || September 20, 2014 || Haleakala || Pan-STARRS ||  || align=right | 1.1 km || 
|-id=009 bgcolor=#d6d6d6
| 566009 ||  || — || December 9, 2010 || Kitt Peak || Spacewatch ||  || align=right | 1.9 km || 
|-id=010 bgcolor=#fefefe
| 566010 ||  || — || April 20, 2013 || Mount Lemmon || Mount Lemmon Survey ||  || align=right data-sort-value="0.89" | 890 m || 
|-id=011 bgcolor=#E9E9E9
| 566011 ||  || — || April 29, 2000 || Anderson Mesa || LONEOS ||  || align=right | 1.6 km || 
|-id=012 bgcolor=#E9E9E9
| 566012 ||  || — || October 3, 2014 || Mount Lemmon || Mount Lemmon Survey ||  || align=right data-sort-value="0.82" | 820 m || 
|-id=013 bgcolor=#E9E9E9
| 566013 ||  || — || March 17, 2012 || Kitt Peak || Spacewatch ||  || align=right | 2.2 km || 
|-id=014 bgcolor=#E9E9E9
| 566014 ||  || — || March 16, 2012 || Haleakala || Pan-STARRS ||  || align=right | 2.1 km || 
|-id=015 bgcolor=#d6d6d6
| 566015 ||  || — || June 9, 2007 || Kitt Peak || Spacewatch ||  || align=right | 2.2 km || 
|-id=016 bgcolor=#E9E9E9
| 566016 ||  || — || October 17, 2001 || Kitt Peak || Spacewatch ||  || align=right | 1.9 km || 
|-id=017 bgcolor=#E9E9E9
| 566017 ||  || — || January 13, 2008 || Kitt Peak || Spacewatch ||  || align=right | 1.7 km || 
|-id=018 bgcolor=#E9E9E9
| 566018 ||  || — || September 13, 2004 || Kitt Peak || Spacewatch ||  || align=right | 1.9 km || 
|-id=019 bgcolor=#E9E9E9
| 566019 ||  || — || September 11, 2010 || Mount Lemmon || Mount Lemmon Survey ||  || align=right | 1.8 km || 
|-id=020 bgcolor=#E9E9E9
| 566020 ||  || — || March 15, 2012 || Mayhill-ISON || L. Elenin ||  || align=right | 2.4 km || 
|-id=021 bgcolor=#d6d6d6
| 566021 ||  || — || May 25, 2012 || ESA OGS || ESA OGS ||  || align=right | 3.1 km || 
|-id=022 bgcolor=#E9E9E9
| 566022 ||  || — || September 19, 2006 || Kitt Peak || Spacewatch ||  || align=right | 1.1 km || 
|-id=023 bgcolor=#E9E9E9
| 566023 ||  || — || January 18, 2012 || Mount Lemmon || Mount Lemmon Survey ||  || align=right | 1.2 km || 
|-id=024 bgcolor=#E9E9E9
| 566024 ||  || — || August 14, 2006 || Siding Spring || SSS ||  || align=right | 1.8 km || 
|-id=025 bgcolor=#d6d6d6
| 566025 ||  || — || March 24, 2001 || Kitt Peak || Spacewatch ||  || align=right | 2.8 km || 
|-id=026 bgcolor=#E9E9E9
| 566026 ||  || — || September 26, 2005 || Kitt Peak || Spacewatch ||  || align=right | 2.3 km || 
|-id=027 bgcolor=#E9E9E9
| 566027 ||  || — || May 22, 2003 || Kitt Peak || Spacewatch ||  || align=right | 2.3 km || 
|-id=028 bgcolor=#d6d6d6
| 566028 ||  || — || October 26, 2013 || Nogales || M. Schwartz, P. R. Holvorcem ||  || align=right | 3.1 km || 
|-id=029 bgcolor=#E9E9E9
| 566029 ||  || — || February 28, 2008 || Kitt Peak || Spacewatch ||  || align=right | 1.4 km || 
|-id=030 bgcolor=#fefefe
| 566030 ||  || — || April 21, 2006 || Siding Spring || SSS ||  || align=right | 1.0 km || 
|-id=031 bgcolor=#E9E9E9
| 566031 ||  || — || September 19, 2001 || Apache Point || SDSS Collaboration ||  || align=right | 2.4 km || 
|-id=032 bgcolor=#E9E9E9
| 566032 ||  || — || February 28, 2008 || Mount Lemmon || Mount Lemmon Survey ||  || align=right | 1.3 km || 
|-id=033 bgcolor=#d6d6d6
| 566033 ||  || — || November 21, 2009 || Mount Lemmon || Mount Lemmon Survey ||  || align=right | 3.1 km || 
|-id=034 bgcolor=#E9E9E9
| 566034 ||  || — || November 17, 1995 || Kitt Peak || Spacewatch ||  || align=right | 2.1 km || 
|-id=035 bgcolor=#E9E9E9
| 566035 ||  || — || May 19, 2017 || Mount Lemmon || Mount Lemmon Survey ||  || align=right | 1.0 km || 
|-id=036 bgcolor=#E9E9E9
| 566036 ||  || — || January 14, 2012 || Mount Lemmon || Mount Lemmon Survey ||  || align=right | 1.5 km || 
|-id=037 bgcolor=#E9E9E9
| 566037 ||  || — || September 18, 2006 || Kitt Peak || Spacewatch ||  || align=right | 1.2 km || 
|-id=038 bgcolor=#E9E9E9
| 566038 ||  || — || January 13, 2011 || Mount Lemmon || Mount Lemmon Survey ||  || align=right | 2.0 km || 
|-id=039 bgcolor=#E9E9E9
| 566039 ||  || — || December 5, 2010 || Mount Lemmon || Mount Lemmon Survey ||  || align=right | 2.9 km || 
|-id=040 bgcolor=#d6d6d6
| 566040 ||  || — || June 2, 2017 || Cerro Tololo-DECam || CTIO-DECam ||  || align=right | 2.4 km || 
|-id=041 bgcolor=#E9E9E9
| 566041 ||  || — || February 17, 2004 || Kitt Peak || Spacewatch ||  || align=right | 1.9 km || 
|-id=042 bgcolor=#fefefe
| 566042 ||  || — || February 23, 2012 || Mount Lemmon || Mount Lemmon Survey ||  || align=right | 1.1 km || 
|-id=043 bgcolor=#d6d6d6
| 566043 ||  || — || July 29, 2001 || Palomar || NEAT ||  || align=right | 4.2 km || 
|-id=044 bgcolor=#E9E9E9
| 566044 ||  || — || February 3, 2012 || Haleakala || Pan-STARRS ||  || align=right | 1.9 km || 
|-id=045 bgcolor=#FA8072
| 566045 ||  || — || June 27, 2001 || Palomar || NEAT ||  || align=right | 1.0 km || 
|-id=046 bgcolor=#d6d6d6
| 566046 ||  || — || November 9, 2007 || Mount Lemmon || Mount Lemmon Survey ||  || align=right | 2.5 km || 
|-id=047 bgcolor=#E9E9E9
| 566047 ||  || — || November 20, 2006 || Kitt Peak || Spacewatch ||  || align=right | 1.6 km || 
|-id=048 bgcolor=#E9E9E9
| 566048 ||  || — || January 6, 2006 || Kitt Peak || Spacewatch ||  || align=right | 1.9 km || 
|-id=049 bgcolor=#E9E9E9
| 566049 ||  || — || August 16, 2009 || Catalina || CSS ||  || align=right | 1.5 km || 
|-id=050 bgcolor=#E9E9E9
| 566050 ||  || — || March 10, 2000 || Socorro || LINEAR ||  || align=right | 1.1 km || 
|-id=051 bgcolor=#E9E9E9
| 566051 ||  || — || August 26, 2005 || Palomar || NEAT ||  || align=right data-sort-value="0.93" | 930 m || 
|-id=052 bgcolor=#E9E9E9
| 566052 ||  || — || February 14, 2012 || Haleakala || Pan-STARRS ||  || align=right data-sort-value="0.95" | 950 m || 
|-id=053 bgcolor=#d6d6d6
| 566053 ||  || — || June 25, 2017 || Haleakala || Pan-STARRS ||  || align=right | 2.7 km || 
|-id=054 bgcolor=#d6d6d6
| 566054 ||  || — || March 11, 2015 || Mount Lemmon || Mount Lemmon Survey ||  || align=right | 2.0 km || 
|-id=055 bgcolor=#d6d6d6
| 566055 ||  || — || June 25, 2017 || Haleakala || Pan-STARRS ||  || align=right | 2.4 km || 
|-id=056 bgcolor=#d6d6d6
| 566056 ||  || — || June 21, 2017 || Haleakala || Pan-STARRS ||  || align=right | 2.5 km || 
|-id=057 bgcolor=#d6d6d6
| 566057 ||  || — || October 28, 2013 || Mount Lemmon || Mount Lemmon Survey ||  || align=right | 2.5 km || 
|-id=058 bgcolor=#E9E9E9
| 566058 ||  || — || September 14, 2013 || Haleakala || Pan-STARRS ||  || align=right | 1.6 km || 
|-id=059 bgcolor=#E9E9E9
| 566059 ||  || — || October 15, 2001 || Palomar || NEAT ||  || align=right data-sort-value="0.94" | 940 m || 
|-id=060 bgcolor=#d6d6d6
| 566060 ||  || — || January 18, 2015 || Haleakala || Pan-STARRS ||  || align=right | 3.0 km || 
|-id=061 bgcolor=#E9E9E9
| 566061 ||  || — || January 1, 2016 || Haleakala || Pan-STARRS ||  || align=right | 1.8 km || 
|-id=062 bgcolor=#d6d6d6
| 566062 ||  || — || January 2, 2009 || Kitt Peak || Spacewatch ||  || align=right | 2.9 km || 
|-id=063 bgcolor=#fefefe
| 566063 ||  || — || July 8, 2010 || Campo Imperatore || Spacewatch ||  || align=right data-sort-value="0.61" | 610 m || 
|-id=064 bgcolor=#d6d6d6
| 566064 ||  || — || June 3, 2016 || Mount Lemmon || Mount Lemmon Survey ||  || align=right | 2.7 km || 
|-id=065 bgcolor=#E9E9E9
| 566065 ||  || — || April 11, 2008 || Mount Lemmon || Mount Lemmon Survey ||  || align=right | 1.5 km || 
|-id=066 bgcolor=#E9E9E9
| 566066 ||  || — || July 28, 2009 || Catalina || CSS ||  || align=right | 1.7 km || 
|-id=067 bgcolor=#E9E9E9
| 566067 ||  || — || January 23, 2011 || Mount Lemmon || Mount Lemmon Survey ||  || align=right | 3.0 km || 
|-id=068 bgcolor=#E9E9E9
| 566068 ||  || — || July 9, 2013 || Haleakala || Pan-STARRS ||  || align=right | 1.2 km || 
|-id=069 bgcolor=#d6d6d6
| 566069 ||  || — || July 4, 2017 || Haleakala || Pan-STARRS ||  || align=right | 2.4 km || 
|-id=070 bgcolor=#d6d6d6
| 566070 ||  || — || May 31, 2006 || Mount Lemmon || Mount Lemmon Survey ||  || align=right | 2.7 km || 
|-id=071 bgcolor=#E9E9E9
| 566071 ||  || — || March 14, 2012 || Haleakala || Pan-STARRS ||  || align=right | 1.4 km || 
|-id=072 bgcolor=#d6d6d6
| 566072 ||  || — || July 22, 2017 || Sutherland-LCO C || SAAO-LCO ||  || align=right | 1.9 km || 
|-id=073 bgcolor=#d6d6d6
| 566073 ||  || — || November 29, 2013 || Haleakala || Pan-STARRS ||  || align=right | 2.8 km || 
|-id=074 bgcolor=#d6d6d6
| 566074 ||  || — || August 12, 2012 || Charleston || R. Holmes ||  || align=right | 3.4 km || 
|-id=075 bgcolor=#d6d6d6
| 566075 ||  || — || April 26, 2011 || Kitt Peak || Spacewatch ||  || align=right | 2.3 km || 
|-id=076 bgcolor=#d6d6d6
| 566076 ||  || — || December 31, 2013 || Haleakala || Pan-STARRS ||  || align=right | 2.1 km || 
|-id=077 bgcolor=#d6d6d6
| 566077 ||  || — || October 8, 2012 || Haleakala || Pan-STARRS ||  || align=right | 3.0 km || 
|-id=078 bgcolor=#E9E9E9
| 566078 ||  || — || April 15, 2007 || Kitt Peak || Spacewatch ||  || align=right | 1.9 km || 
|-id=079 bgcolor=#E9E9E9
| 566079 ||  || — || July 30, 2008 || Mount Lemmon || Mount Lemmon Survey ||  || align=right | 2.3 km || 
|-id=080 bgcolor=#d6d6d6
| 566080 ||  || — || May 1, 2011 || Haleakala || Pan-STARRS ||  || align=right | 2.4 km || 
|-id=081 bgcolor=#E9E9E9
| 566081 ||  || — || September 3, 2008 || Kitt Peak || Spacewatch ||  || align=right | 1.7 km || 
|-id=082 bgcolor=#d6d6d6
| 566082 ||  || — || January 17, 2015 || Palomar || Pan-STARRS ||  || align=right | 3.0 km || 
|-id=083 bgcolor=#d6d6d6
| 566083 ||  || — || January 18, 2009 || Mount Lemmon || Mount Lemmon Survey ||  || align=right | 2.3 km || 
|-id=084 bgcolor=#d6d6d6
| 566084 ||  || — || May 14, 2005 || Mount Lemmon || Mount Lemmon Survey ||  || align=right | 2.3 km || 
|-id=085 bgcolor=#d6d6d6
| 566085 ||  || — || April 26, 2016 || Haleakala || Pan-STARRS ||  || align=right | 3.1 km || 
|-id=086 bgcolor=#E9E9E9
| 566086 ||  || — || March 7, 2016 || Haleakala || Pan-STARRS ||  || align=right | 1.8 km || 
|-id=087 bgcolor=#E9E9E9
| 566087 ||  || — || March 30, 2016 || Haleakala || Pan-STARRS ||  || align=right | 1.7 km || 
|-id=088 bgcolor=#d6d6d6
| 566088 ||  || — || July 25, 2017 || Haleakala || Pan-STARRS ||  || align=right | 2.4 km || 
|-id=089 bgcolor=#d6d6d6
| 566089 ||  || — || December 2, 2014 || Haleakala || Pan-STARRS ||  || align=right | 2.5 km || 
|-id=090 bgcolor=#d6d6d6
| 566090 ||  || — || July 26, 2017 || Haleakala || Pan-STARRS ||  || align=right | 2.1 km || 
|-id=091 bgcolor=#FA8072
| 566091 ||  || — || January 13, 2008 || Kitt Peak || Spacewatch ||  || align=right data-sort-value="0.35" | 350 m || 
|-id=092 bgcolor=#E9E9E9
| 566092 ||  || — || September 17, 2004 || Anderson Mesa || LONEOS ||  || align=right | 1.5 km || 
|-id=093 bgcolor=#d6d6d6
| 566093 ||  || — || September 23, 2008 || Kitt Peak || Spacewatch ||  || align=right | 1.7 km || 
|-id=094 bgcolor=#d6d6d6
| 566094 ||  || — || November 27, 2013 || Haleakala || Pan-STARRS ||  || align=right | 2.8 km || 
|-id=095 bgcolor=#d6d6d6
| 566095 ||  || — || August 26, 2012 || Haleakala || Pan-STARRS ||  || align=right | 2.1 km || 
|-id=096 bgcolor=#d6d6d6
| 566096 ||  || — || February 23, 2015 || Haleakala || Pan-STARRS ||  || align=right | 1.9 km || 
|-id=097 bgcolor=#d6d6d6
| 566097 ||  || — || July 26, 2017 || Haleakala || Pan-STARRS ||  || align=right | 2.3 km || 
|-id=098 bgcolor=#d6d6d6
| 566098 ||  || — || October 19, 2012 || Haleakala || Pan-STARRS ||  || align=right | 3.0 km || 
|-id=099 bgcolor=#d6d6d6
| 566099 ||  || — || May 22, 2011 || Mount Lemmon || Mount Lemmon Survey ||  || align=right | 2.4 km || 
|-id=100 bgcolor=#d6d6d6
| 566100 ||  || — || September 19, 2006 || Kitt Peak || Spacewatch ||  || align=right | 2.4 km || 
|}

566101–566200 

|-bgcolor=#d6d6d6
| 566101 ||  || — || February 20, 2015 || Haleakala || Pan-STARRS ||  || align=right | 2.2 km || 
|-id=102 bgcolor=#d6d6d6
| 566102 ||  || — || September 13, 2007 || Kitt Peak || Spacewatch ||  || align=right | 1.9 km || 
|-id=103 bgcolor=#d6d6d6
| 566103 ||  || — || March 16, 2015 || Kitt Peak || Spacewatch ||  || align=right | 2.3 km || 
|-id=104 bgcolor=#d6d6d6
| 566104 ||  || — || December 4, 2008 || Mount Lemmon || Mount Lemmon Survey ||  || align=right | 3.4 km || 
|-id=105 bgcolor=#E9E9E9
| 566105 ||  || — || August 13, 2004 || Cerro Tololo || Cerro Tololo Obs. ||  || align=right | 1.4 km || 
|-id=106 bgcolor=#d6d6d6
| 566106 ||  || — || September 10, 2007 || Kitt Peak || Spacewatch ||  || align=right | 1.8 km || 
|-id=107 bgcolor=#d6d6d6
| 566107 ||  || — || March 26, 2011 || Mount Lemmon || Mount Lemmon Survey ||  || align=right | 2.0 km || 
|-id=108 bgcolor=#d6d6d6
| 566108 ||  || — || March 13, 2010 || Mount Lemmon || Mount Lemmon Survey ||  || align=right | 2.4 km || 
|-id=109 bgcolor=#d6d6d6
| 566109 ||  || — || October 8, 2012 || Mount Lemmon || Mount Lemmon Survey ||  || align=right | 2.1 km || 
|-id=110 bgcolor=#d6d6d6
| 566110 ||  || — || October 3, 2006 || Mount Lemmon || Mount Lemmon Survey ||  || align=right | 2.5 km || 
|-id=111 bgcolor=#E9E9E9
| 566111 ||  || — || July 29, 2008 || Charleston || R. Holmes ||  || align=right | 1.7 km || 
|-id=112 bgcolor=#d6d6d6
| 566112 ||  || — || February 23, 2015 || Haleakala || Pan-STARRS ||  || align=right | 2.3 km || 
|-id=113 bgcolor=#d6d6d6
| 566113 ||  || — || December 11, 2012 || Mount Lemmon || Mount Lemmon Survey || 7:4 || align=right | 3.5 km || 
|-id=114 bgcolor=#d6d6d6
| 566114 ||  || — || January 20, 2014 || Mount Lemmon || Mount Lemmon Survey ||  || align=right | 2.6 km || 
|-id=115 bgcolor=#d6d6d6
| 566115 ||  || — || July 27, 2017 || Haleakala || Pan-STARRS || 7:4 || align=right | 2.9 km || 
|-id=116 bgcolor=#E9E9E9
| 566116 ||  || — || July 23, 2003 || Palomar || NEAT ||  || align=right | 2.5 km || 
|-id=117 bgcolor=#E9E9E9
| 566117 ||  || — || December 2, 2005 || Mount Lemmon || Mount Lemmon Survey ||  || align=right | 1.5 km || 
|-id=118 bgcolor=#E9E9E9
| 566118 ||  || — || June 4, 2003 || Kitt Peak || Spacewatch ||  || align=right | 2.3 km || 
|-id=119 bgcolor=#E9E9E9
| 566119 ||  || — || August 4, 2003 || Kitt Peak || Spacewatch ||  || align=right | 2.5 km || 
|-id=120 bgcolor=#d6d6d6
| 566120 ||  || — || December 30, 2008 || Mount Lemmon || Mount Lemmon Survey ||  || align=right | 3.2 km || 
|-id=121 bgcolor=#d6d6d6
| 566121 ||  || — || August 19, 2006 || Kitt Peak || Spacewatch ||  || align=right | 2.4 km || 
|-id=122 bgcolor=#E9E9E9
| 566122 ||  || — || September 26, 2000 || Kitt Peak || Spacewatch ||  || align=right | 1.6 km || 
|-id=123 bgcolor=#d6d6d6
| 566123 ||  || — || January 16, 2015 || Haleakala || Pan-STARRS ||  || align=right | 2.5 km || 
|-id=124 bgcolor=#d6d6d6
| 566124 ||  || — || July 30, 2017 || Haleakala || Pan-STARRS || 7:4 || align=right | 3.0 km || 
|-id=125 bgcolor=#d6d6d6
| 566125 ||  || — || September 11, 2007 || Mount Lemmon || Mount Lemmon Survey ||  || align=right | 2.0 km || 
|-id=126 bgcolor=#d6d6d6
| 566126 ||  || — || May 30, 2016 || Haleakala || Pan-STARRS ||  || align=right | 2.2 km || 
|-id=127 bgcolor=#d6d6d6
| 566127 ||  || — || May 26, 2006 || Mount Lemmon || Mount Lemmon Survey ||  || align=right | 3.7 km || 
|-id=128 bgcolor=#d6d6d6
| 566128 ||  || — || April 11, 2010 || Mount Lemmon || Mount Lemmon Survey ||  || align=right | 2.2 km || 
|-id=129 bgcolor=#E9E9E9
| 566129 ||  || — || February 3, 2016 || Haleakala || Pan-STARRS ||  || align=right | 1.2 km || 
|-id=130 bgcolor=#E9E9E9
| 566130 ||  || — || May 15, 2012 || Haleakala || Pan-STARRS ||  || align=right | 1.5 km || 
|-id=131 bgcolor=#d6d6d6
| 566131 ||  || — || August 29, 2006 || Kitt Peak || Spacewatch ||  || align=right | 2.2 km || 
|-id=132 bgcolor=#d6d6d6
| 566132 ||  || — || July 25, 2017 || Haleakala || Pan-STARRS ||  || align=right | 3.0 km || 
|-id=133 bgcolor=#d6d6d6
| 566133 ||  || — || July 26, 2017 || Haleakala || Pan-STARRS ||  || align=right | 2.1 km || 
|-id=134 bgcolor=#d6d6d6
| 566134 ||  || — || July 25, 2017 || La Silla || Pan-STARRS ||  || align=right | 2.1 km || 
|-id=135 bgcolor=#d6d6d6
| 566135 ||  || — || October 13, 2012 || ESA OGS || ESA OGS ||  || align=right | 2.0 km || 
|-id=136 bgcolor=#d6d6d6
| 566136 ||  || — || July 26, 2017 || Haleakala || Pan-STARRS ||  || align=right | 2.2 km || 
|-id=137 bgcolor=#d6d6d6
| 566137 ||  || — || July 22, 2017 || ESA OGS || ESA OGS ||  || align=right | 2.0 km || 
|-id=138 bgcolor=#d6d6d6
| 566138 ||  || — || July 30, 2017 || Haleakala || Pan-STARRS ||  || align=right | 2.4 km || 
|-id=139 bgcolor=#d6d6d6
| 566139 ||  || — || July 26, 2017 || Haleakala || Pan-STARRS || 7:4 || align=right | 2.3 km || 
|-id=140 bgcolor=#d6d6d6
| 566140 ||  || — || July 25, 2017 || Haleakala || Pan-STARRS ||  || align=right | 2.2 km || 
|-id=141 bgcolor=#E9E9E9
| 566141 ||  || — || April 29, 2008 || Mount Lemmon || Mount Lemmon Survey ||  || align=right data-sort-value="0.81" | 810 m || 
|-id=142 bgcolor=#d6d6d6
| 566142 ||  || — || August 1, 2017 || Haleakala || Pan-STARRS ||  || align=right | 2.3 km || 
|-id=143 bgcolor=#d6d6d6
| 566143 ||  || — || October 21, 2012 || Mount Lemmon || Mount Lemmon Survey ||  || align=right | 2.2 km || 
|-id=144 bgcolor=#d6d6d6
| 566144 ||  || — || October 8, 2012 || Haleakala || Pan-STARRS ||  || align=right | 2.1 km || 
|-id=145 bgcolor=#d6d6d6
| 566145 ||  || — || April 11, 2010 || Mount Lemmon || Mount Lemmon Survey ||  || align=right | 2.6 km || 
|-id=146 bgcolor=#d6d6d6
| 566146 ||  || — || August 24, 2006 || Pises || Pises Obs. ||  || align=right | 2.0 km || 
|-id=147 bgcolor=#d6d6d6
| 566147 ||  || — || February 16, 2015 || Haleakala || Pan-STARRS ||  || align=right | 1.9 km || 
|-id=148 bgcolor=#d6d6d6
| 566148 ||  || — || October 3, 2006 || Mount Lemmon || Mount Lemmon Survey ||  || align=right | 2.4 km || 
|-id=149 bgcolor=#d6d6d6
| 566149 ||  || — || August 28, 2006 || Catalina || CSS ||  || align=right | 2.7 km || 
|-id=150 bgcolor=#d6d6d6
| 566150 ||  || — || February 16, 2015 || Haleakala || Pan-STARRS ||  || align=right | 2.3 km || 
|-id=151 bgcolor=#d6d6d6
| 566151 ||  || — || March 24, 2015 || Mount Lemmon || Mount Lemmon Survey ||  || align=right | 2.3 km || 
|-id=152 bgcolor=#d6d6d6
| 566152 ||  || — || January 1, 2014 || Mount Lemmon || Mount Lemmon Survey ||  || align=right | 2.2 km || 
|-id=153 bgcolor=#d6d6d6
| 566153 ||  || — || November 11, 2001 || Apache Point || SDSS Collaboration ||  || align=right | 2.6 km || 
|-id=154 bgcolor=#d6d6d6
| 566154 ||  || — || January 22, 2015 || Haleakala || Pan-STARRS ||  || align=right | 1.9 km || 
|-id=155 bgcolor=#FA8072
| 566155 ||  || — || November 7, 2015 || Catalina || CSS || H || align=right data-sort-value="0.77" | 770 m || 
|-id=156 bgcolor=#d6d6d6
| 566156 ||  || — || July 27, 2017 || Haleakala || Pan-STARRS ||  || align=right | 2.2 km || 
|-id=157 bgcolor=#d6d6d6
| 566157 ||  || — || August 14, 2012 || Haleakala || Pan-STARRS ||  || align=right | 2.2 km || 
|-id=158 bgcolor=#d6d6d6
| 566158 ||  || — || January 19, 2015 || Mount Lemmon || Mount Lemmon Survey ||  || align=right | 2.2 km || 
|-id=159 bgcolor=#d6d6d6
| 566159 ||  || — || April 12, 2005 || Kitt Peak || Spacewatch ||  || align=right | 3.1 km || 
|-id=160 bgcolor=#E9E9E9
| 566160 ||  || — || May 13, 2012 || Mount Lemmon || Mount Lemmon Survey ||  || align=right | 1.5 km || 
|-id=161 bgcolor=#d6d6d6
| 566161 ||  || — || September 13, 2007 || Mount Lemmon || Mount Lemmon Survey ||  || align=right | 1.7 km || 
|-id=162 bgcolor=#d6d6d6
| 566162 ||  || — || January 21, 2015 || Haleakala || Pan-STARRS ||  || align=right | 2.3 km || 
|-id=163 bgcolor=#d6d6d6
| 566163 ||  || — || January 15, 2015 || Kitt Peak || Pan-STARRS ||  || align=right | 2.6 km || 
|-id=164 bgcolor=#d6d6d6
| 566164 ||  || — || January 20, 2015 || Haleakala || Pan-STARRS ||  || align=right | 2.3 km || 
|-id=165 bgcolor=#d6d6d6
| 566165 ||  || — || March 8, 2005 || Mount Lemmon || Mount Lemmon Survey ||  || align=right | 2.3 km || 
|-id=166 bgcolor=#d6d6d6
| 566166 ||  || — || January 11, 2010 || Kitt Peak || Spacewatch ||  || align=right | 3.2 km || 
|-id=167 bgcolor=#E9E9E9
| 566167 ||  || — || January 31, 2006 || Kitt Peak || Spacewatch ||  || align=right | 2.3 km || 
|-id=168 bgcolor=#d6d6d6
| 566168 ||  || — || March 17, 2015 || Haleakala || Pan-STARRS ||  || align=right | 2.6 km || 
|-id=169 bgcolor=#d6d6d6
| 566169 ||  || — || August 3, 2017 || Haleakala || Pan-STARRS ||  || align=right | 1.9 km || 
|-id=170 bgcolor=#d6d6d6
| 566170 ||  || — || January 10, 2014 || Mount Lemmon || Mount Lemmon Survey ||  || align=right | 2.3 km || 
|-id=171 bgcolor=#d6d6d6
| 566171 ||  || — || June 17, 2006 || Kitt Peak || Spacewatch ||  || align=right | 2.6 km || 
|-id=172 bgcolor=#d6d6d6
| 566172 ||  || — || November 29, 2013 || Haleakala || Pan-STARRS ||  || align=right | 2.9 km || 
|-id=173 bgcolor=#d6d6d6
| 566173 ||  || — || August 17, 2017 || Haleakala || Pan-STARRS ||  || align=right | 2.0 km || 
|-id=174 bgcolor=#E9E9E9
| 566174 ||  || — || May 9, 2007 || Mount Lemmon || Mount Lemmon Survey ||  || align=right | 2.2 km || 
|-id=175 bgcolor=#d6d6d6
| 566175 ||  || — || January 22, 2015 || Haleakala || Pan-STARRS ||  || align=right | 2.2 km || 
|-id=176 bgcolor=#E9E9E9
| 566176 ||  || — || September 19, 2008 || Kitt Peak || Spacewatch ||  || align=right | 1.7 km || 
|-id=177 bgcolor=#d6d6d6
| 566177 ||  || — || February 5, 2009 || Kitt Peak || Spacewatch ||  || align=right | 2.5 km || 
|-id=178 bgcolor=#d6d6d6
| 566178 ||  || — || May 3, 2011 || Kitt Peak || Spacewatch ||  || align=right | 2.8 km || 
|-id=179 bgcolor=#d6d6d6
| 566179 ||  || — || August 6, 2012 || Haleakala || Pan-STARRS ||  || align=right | 1.9 km || 
|-id=180 bgcolor=#E9E9E9
| 566180 ||  || — || September 20, 2003 || Kitt Peak || Spacewatch ||  || align=right | 2.2 km || 
|-id=181 bgcolor=#E9E9E9
| 566181 ||  || — || October 24, 2009 || Kitt Peak || Spacewatch ||  || align=right | 1.3 km || 
|-id=182 bgcolor=#E9E9E9
| 566182 ||  || — || March 12, 2016 || Haleakala || Pan-STARRS ||  || align=right | 1.3 km || 
|-id=183 bgcolor=#d6d6d6
| 566183 ||  || — || November 4, 2012 || Mount Lemmon || Mount Lemmon Survey ||  || align=right | 2.3 km || 
|-id=184 bgcolor=#E9E9E9
| 566184 ||  || — || May 7, 2007 || Kitt Peak || Spacewatch ||  || align=right | 2.2 km || 
|-id=185 bgcolor=#d6d6d6
| 566185 ||  || — || October 21, 2007 || Mount Lemmon || Mount Lemmon Survey ||  || align=right | 3.1 km || 
|-id=186 bgcolor=#d6d6d6
| 566186 ||  || — || October 9, 2008 || Mount Lemmon || Mount Lemmon Survey ||  || align=right | 2.0 km || 
|-id=187 bgcolor=#d6d6d6
| 566187 ||  || — || January 14, 2015 || Haleakala || Pan-STARRS ||  || align=right | 2.5 km || 
|-id=188 bgcolor=#d6d6d6
| 566188 ||  || — || September 11, 2007 || Kitt Peak || Spacewatch ||  || align=right | 2.5 km || 
|-id=189 bgcolor=#d6d6d6
| 566189 ||  || — || November 27, 2013 || Haleakala || Pan-STARRS ||  || align=right | 4.0 km || 
|-id=190 bgcolor=#d6d6d6
| 566190 ||  || — || February 4, 2009 || Mount Lemmon || Mount Lemmon Survey ||  || align=right | 2.7 km || 
|-id=191 bgcolor=#d6d6d6
| 566191 ||  || — || July 26, 2017 || Haleakala || Pan-STARRS ||  || align=right | 2.5 km || 
|-id=192 bgcolor=#d6d6d6
| 566192 ||  || — || February 1, 2009 || Kitt Peak || Spacewatch ||  || align=right | 2.3 km || 
|-id=193 bgcolor=#d6d6d6
| 566193 ||  || — || February 27, 2015 || Haleakala || Pan-STARRS ||  || align=right | 2.2 km || 
|-id=194 bgcolor=#d6d6d6
| 566194 ||  || — || February 19, 2009 || Mount Lemmon || Mount Lemmon Survey ||  || align=right | 2.7 km || 
|-id=195 bgcolor=#d6d6d6
| 566195 ||  || — || January 3, 2009 || Mount Lemmon || Mount Lemmon Survey ||  || align=right | 3.0 km || 
|-id=196 bgcolor=#d6d6d6
| 566196 ||  || — || January 21, 2015 || Haleakala || Pan-STARRS ||  || align=right | 2.0 km || 
|-id=197 bgcolor=#d6d6d6
| 566197 ||  || — || December 29, 2014 || Haleakala || Pan-STARRS ||  || align=right | 2.3 km || 
|-id=198 bgcolor=#d6d6d6
| 566198 ||  || — || October 19, 2007 || Mount Lemmon || Mount Lemmon Survey ||  || align=right | 1.8 km || 
|-id=199 bgcolor=#d6d6d6
| 566199 ||  || — || March 14, 2005 || Mount Lemmon || Mount Lemmon Survey ||  || align=right | 2.8 km || 
|-id=200 bgcolor=#d6d6d6
| 566200 ||  || — || December 22, 2008 || Mount Lemmon || Mount Lemmon Survey ||  || align=right | 2.9 km || 
|}

566201–566300 

|-bgcolor=#d6d6d6
| 566201 ||  || — || January 21, 2015 || Haleakala || Pan-STARRS ||  || align=right | 2.5 km || 
|-id=202 bgcolor=#d6d6d6
| 566202 ||  || — || September 15, 2006 || Kitt Peak || Spacewatch ||  || align=right | 2.6 km || 
|-id=203 bgcolor=#d6d6d6
| 566203 ||  || — || March 19, 2010 || Kitt Peak || Spacewatch ||  || align=right | 2.2 km || 
|-id=204 bgcolor=#E9E9E9
| 566204 ||  || — || January 16, 2015 || Haleakala || Pan-STARRS ||  || align=right | 1.7 km || 
|-id=205 bgcolor=#d6d6d6
| 566205 ||  || — || August 27, 2006 || Kitt Peak || Spacewatch ||  || align=right | 3.1 km || 
|-id=206 bgcolor=#E9E9E9
| 566206 ||  || — || September 9, 2008 || Mount Lemmon || Mount Lemmon Survey ||  || align=right | 2.6 km || 
|-id=207 bgcolor=#E9E9E9
| 566207 ||  || — || July 18, 2013 || Haleakala || Pan-STARRS ||  || align=right | 2.9 km || 
|-id=208 bgcolor=#d6d6d6
| 566208 ||  || — || May 31, 2011 || Mount Lemmon || Mount Lemmon Survey ||  || align=right | 2.3 km || 
|-id=209 bgcolor=#E9E9E9
| 566209 ||  || — || March 6, 2008 || Mount Lemmon || Mount Lemmon Survey ||  || align=right | 1.0 km || 
|-id=210 bgcolor=#d6d6d6
| 566210 ||  || — || February 16, 2015 || Haleakala || Pan-STARRS ||  || align=right | 2.3 km || 
|-id=211 bgcolor=#d6d6d6
| 566211 ||  || — || October 14, 2007 || Bergisch Gladbach || W. Bickel ||  || align=right | 2.1 km || 
|-id=212 bgcolor=#d6d6d6
| 566212 ||  || — || August 29, 2006 || Kitt Peak || Spacewatch ||  || align=right | 2.8 km || 
|-id=213 bgcolor=#d6d6d6
| 566213 ||  || — || March 4, 2016 || Haleakala || Pan-STARRS ||  || align=right | 2.5 km || 
|-id=214 bgcolor=#d6d6d6
| 566214 ||  || — || October 3, 2006 || Mount Lemmon || Mount Lemmon Survey ||  || align=right | 3.0 km || 
|-id=215 bgcolor=#E9E9E9
| 566215 ||  || — || August 4, 2008 || La Sagra || OAM Obs. ||  || align=right | 1.5 km || 
|-id=216 bgcolor=#d6d6d6
| 566216 ||  || — || January 26, 2014 || Haleakala || Pan-STARRS ||  || align=right | 2.6 km || 
|-id=217 bgcolor=#d6d6d6
| 566217 ||  || — || February 9, 2008 || Mount Lemmon || Mount Lemmon Survey ||  || align=right | 2.6 km || 
|-id=218 bgcolor=#d6d6d6
| 566218 ||  || — || October 20, 2012 || Mount Lemmon || Mount Lemmon Survey ||  || align=right | 2.4 km || 
|-id=219 bgcolor=#d6d6d6
| 566219 ||  || — || June 6, 2005 || Kitt Peak || Spacewatch ||  || align=right | 2.3 km || 
|-id=220 bgcolor=#d6d6d6
| 566220 ||  || — || August 21, 2011 || Haleakala || Pan-STARRS ||  || align=right | 2.7 km || 
|-id=221 bgcolor=#d6d6d6
| 566221 ||  || — || November 2, 2006 || Kitt Peak || Mount Lemmon Survey ||  || align=right | 3.2 km || 
|-id=222 bgcolor=#d6d6d6
| 566222 ||  || — || October 20, 2007 || Mount Lemmon || Mount Lemmon Survey ||  || align=right | 2.1 km || 
|-id=223 bgcolor=#E9E9E9
| 566223 ||  || — || September 9, 2008 || Kitt Peak || Spacewatch ||  || align=right | 2.4 km || 
|-id=224 bgcolor=#d6d6d6
| 566224 ||  || — || September 17, 2012 || Kitt Peak || Spacewatch ||  || align=right | 2.7 km || 
|-id=225 bgcolor=#d6d6d6
| 566225 ||  || — || October 8, 2012 || Haleakala || Pan-STARRS ||  || align=right | 2.6 km || 
|-id=226 bgcolor=#d6d6d6
| 566226 ||  || — || April 12, 2016 || Haleakala || Pan-STARRS ||  || align=right | 2.7 km || 
|-id=227 bgcolor=#d6d6d6
| 566227 ||  || — || August 12, 2012 || Kitt Peak || Spacewatch ||  || align=right | 2.9 km || 
|-id=228 bgcolor=#d6d6d6
| 566228 ||  || — || April 4, 2005 || Mount Lemmon || Mount Lemmon Survey ||  || align=right | 2.9 km || 
|-id=229 bgcolor=#d6d6d6
| 566229 ||  || — || September 20, 2006 || Kitt Peak || Spacewatch ||  || align=right | 2.3 km || 
|-id=230 bgcolor=#d6d6d6
| 566230 ||  || — || October 19, 1995 || Kitt Peak || Spacewatch ||  || align=right | 2.1 km || 
|-id=231 bgcolor=#d6d6d6
| 566231 ||  || — || October 10, 2012 || Mount Lemmon || Mount Lemmon Survey ||  || align=right | 2.4 km || 
|-id=232 bgcolor=#d6d6d6
| 566232 ||  || — || August 16, 2017 || Haleakala || Pan-STARRS ||  || align=right | 1.9 km || 
|-id=233 bgcolor=#d6d6d6
| 566233 ||  || — || August 18, 2017 || Haleakala || Pan-STARRS ||  || align=right | 2.8 km || 
|-id=234 bgcolor=#d6d6d6
| 566234 ||  || — || August 16, 2017 || Haleakala || Pan-STARRS ||  || align=right | 2.0 km || 
|-id=235 bgcolor=#d6d6d6
| 566235 ||  || — || September 27, 2011 || Mount Lemmon || Mount Lemmon Survey || 7:4 || align=right | 2.5 km || 
|-id=236 bgcolor=#d6d6d6
| 566236 ||  || — || December 27, 2013 || Mount Lemmon || Mount Lemmon Survey ||  || align=right | 2.4 km || 
|-id=237 bgcolor=#d6d6d6
| 566237 ||  || — || February 3, 2009 || Kitt Peak || Spacewatch ||  || align=right | 2.5 km || 
|-id=238 bgcolor=#d6d6d6
| 566238 ||  || — || February 16, 2009 || Kitt Peak || Spacewatch ||  || align=right | 2.8 km || 
|-id=239 bgcolor=#d6d6d6
| 566239 ||  || — || March 16, 2015 || Mount Lemmon || Mount Lemmon Survey ||  || align=right | 1.9 km || 
|-id=240 bgcolor=#d6d6d6
| 566240 ||  || — || January 31, 2009 || Mount Lemmon || Mount Lemmon Survey ||  || align=right | 2.5 km || 
|-id=241 bgcolor=#d6d6d6
| 566241 ||  || — || April 20, 2004 || Kitt Peak || Spacewatch ||  || align=right | 3.4 km || 
|-id=242 bgcolor=#FA8072
| 566242 ||  || — || March 11, 2004 || Palomar || NEAT || H || align=right data-sort-value="0.53" | 530 m || 
|-id=243 bgcolor=#d6d6d6
| 566243 ||  || — || September 14, 2006 || Kitt Peak || Spacewatch ||  || align=right | 2.7 km || 
|-id=244 bgcolor=#d6d6d6
| 566244 ||  || — || September 14, 2007 || Mauna Kea || Mauna Kea Obs. ||  || align=right | 2.2 km || 
|-id=245 bgcolor=#d6d6d6
| 566245 ||  || — || August 26, 2012 || Haleakala || Pan-STARRS ||  || align=right | 2.9 km || 
|-id=246 bgcolor=#d6d6d6
| 566246 ||  || — || September 18, 2012 || Mount Lemmon || Mount Lemmon Survey ||  || align=right | 2.0 km || 
|-id=247 bgcolor=#d6d6d6
| 566247 ||  || — || June 15, 2010 || Kitt Peak || Spacewatch ||  || align=right | 2.8 km || 
|-id=248 bgcolor=#d6d6d6
| 566248 ||  || — || January 31, 2009 || Kitt Peak || Spacewatch ||  || align=right | 2.9 km || 
|-id=249 bgcolor=#d6d6d6
| 566249 ||  || — || September 5, 2000 || Apache Point || SDSS Collaboration ||  || align=right | 3.1 km || 
|-id=250 bgcolor=#d6d6d6
| 566250 ||  || — || April 9, 2010 || Mount Lemmon || Mount Lemmon Survey ||  || align=right | 2.8 km || 
|-id=251 bgcolor=#d6d6d6
| 566251 ||  || — || January 1, 2009 || Mount Lemmon || Mount Lemmon Survey ||  || align=right | 2.7 km || 
|-id=252 bgcolor=#d6d6d6
| 566252 ||  || — || February 26, 2004 || Kitt Peak || M. W. Buie, D. E. Trilling ||  || align=right | 2.8 km || 
|-id=253 bgcolor=#d6d6d6
| 566253 ||  || — || September 15, 2006 || Kitt Peak || Spacewatch ||  || align=right | 2.8 km || 
|-id=254 bgcolor=#d6d6d6
| 566254 ||  || — || September 17, 2012 || Mount Lemmon || Mount Lemmon Survey ||  || align=right | 2.5 km || 
|-id=255 bgcolor=#d6d6d6
| 566255 ||  || — || April 9, 2010 || Mount Lemmon || Mount Lemmon Survey ||  || align=right | 2.3 km || 
|-id=256 bgcolor=#d6d6d6
| 566256 ||  || — || August 21, 2006 || Kitt Peak || Spacewatch ||  || align=right | 2.5 km || 
|-id=257 bgcolor=#d6d6d6
| 566257 ||  || — || September 13, 2007 || Mount Lemmon || Mount Lemmon Survey ||  || align=right | 2.0 km || 
|-id=258 bgcolor=#d6d6d6
| 566258 ||  || — || September 15, 2006 || Kitt Peak || Spacewatch ||  || align=right | 2.5 km || 
|-id=259 bgcolor=#d6d6d6
| 566259 ||  || — || October 7, 1996 || Kitt Peak || Spacewatch ||  || align=right | 2.8 km || 
|-id=260 bgcolor=#d6d6d6
| 566260 ||  || — || April 11, 2005 || Kitt Peak || Spacewatch ||  || align=right | 2.2 km || 
|-id=261 bgcolor=#d6d6d6
| 566261 ||  || — || October 28, 2006 || Mount Lemmon || Mount Lemmon Survey ||  || align=right | 2.4 km || 
|-id=262 bgcolor=#d6d6d6
| 566262 ||  || — || September 30, 2006 || Kitt Peak || Spacewatch ||  || align=right | 2.4 km || 
|-id=263 bgcolor=#d6d6d6
| 566263 ||  || — || July 21, 2006 || Mount Lemmon || Mount Lemmon Survey ||  || align=right | 3.4 km || 
|-id=264 bgcolor=#d6d6d6
| 566264 ||  || — || September 17, 2006 || Kitt Peak || Spacewatch ||  || align=right | 3.4 km || 
|-id=265 bgcolor=#d6d6d6
| 566265 ||  || — || March 21, 2015 || Haleakala || Pan-STARRS ||  || align=right | 2.4 km || 
|-id=266 bgcolor=#d6d6d6
| 566266 ||  || — || February 27, 2009 || Kitt Peak || Spacewatch ||  || align=right | 2.6 km || 
|-id=267 bgcolor=#d6d6d6
| 566267 ||  || — || August 6, 2005 || Palomar || NEAT ||  || align=right | 2.7 km || 
|-id=268 bgcolor=#d6d6d6
| 566268 ||  || — || May 30, 2003 || Cerro Tololo || M. W. Buie, K. J. Meech ||  || align=right | 2.4 km || 
|-id=269 bgcolor=#d6d6d6
| 566269 ||  || — || October 18, 2012 || Haleakala || Pan-STARRS ||  || align=right | 2.3 km || 
|-id=270 bgcolor=#E9E9E9
| 566270 ||  || — || January 18, 2015 || Haleakala || Pan-STARRS ||  || align=right | 1.8 km || 
|-id=271 bgcolor=#d6d6d6
| 566271 ||  || — || October 6, 2012 || Haleakala || Pan-STARRS ||  || align=right | 2.2 km || 
|-id=272 bgcolor=#d6d6d6
| 566272 ||  || — || September 21, 2011 || Mount Lemmon || Mount Lemmon Survey ||  || align=right | 2.8 km || 
|-id=273 bgcolor=#E9E9E9
| 566273 ||  || — || September 21, 1995 || Kitt Peak || Spacewatch ||  || align=right | 1.6 km || 
|-id=274 bgcolor=#E9E9E9
| 566274 ||  || — || January 31, 2006 || Kitt Peak || Spacewatch ||  || align=right | 2.0 km || 
|-id=275 bgcolor=#d6d6d6
| 566275 ||  || — || October 17, 2012 || Haleakala || Pan-STARRS ||  || align=right | 2.2 km || 
|-id=276 bgcolor=#d6d6d6
| 566276 ||  || — || November 19, 2003 || Kitt Peak || Spacewatch ||  || align=right | 2.1 km || 
|-id=277 bgcolor=#d6d6d6
| 566277 ||  || — || September 18, 2006 || Mauna Kea || Mauna Kea Obs. ||  || align=right | 2.6 km || 
|-id=278 bgcolor=#d6d6d6
| 566278 ||  || — || January 31, 2009 || Mount Lemmon || Mount Lemmon Survey ||  || align=right | 2.2 km || 
|-id=279 bgcolor=#d6d6d6
| 566279 ||  || — || September 22, 2001 || Kitt Peak || Spacewatch ||  || align=right | 2.3 km || 
|-id=280 bgcolor=#d6d6d6
| 566280 ||  || — || April 4, 2010 || Kitt Peak || Spacewatch ||  || align=right | 2.1 km || 
|-id=281 bgcolor=#d6d6d6
| 566281 ||  || — || August 24, 2011 || Haleakala || Pan-STARRS ||  || align=right | 2.3 km || 
|-id=282 bgcolor=#d6d6d6
| 566282 ||  || — || January 31, 2014 || Haleakala || Pan-STARRS ||  || align=right | 2.9 km || 
|-id=283 bgcolor=#d6d6d6
| 566283 ||  || — || October 22, 2006 || Kitt Peak || Spacewatch ||  || align=right | 2.2 km || 
|-id=284 bgcolor=#d6d6d6
| 566284 ||  || — || March 21, 2009 || Mount Lemmon || Mount Lemmon Survey ||  || align=right | 2.4 km || 
|-id=285 bgcolor=#d6d6d6
| 566285 ||  || — || October 22, 2012 || Haleakala || Pan-STARRS ||  || align=right | 2.5 km || 
|-id=286 bgcolor=#E9E9E9
| 566286 ||  || — || March 10, 2007 || Mount Lemmon || Mount Lemmon Survey ||  || align=right | 1.8 km || 
|-id=287 bgcolor=#d6d6d6
| 566287 ||  || — || September 11, 2001 || Kitt Peak || Spacewatch ||  || align=right | 1.9 km || 
|-id=288 bgcolor=#fefefe
| 566288 ||  || — || January 16, 2005 || Mauna Kea || Mauna Kea Obs. ||  || align=right data-sort-value="0.60" | 600 m || 
|-id=289 bgcolor=#d6d6d6
| 566289 ||  || — || March 14, 2010 || Mount Lemmon || Mount Lemmon Survey ||  || align=right | 1.8 km || 
|-id=290 bgcolor=#d6d6d6
| 566290 ||  || — || February 19, 2009 || Kitt Peak || Spacewatch ||  || align=right | 2.8 km || 
|-id=291 bgcolor=#d6d6d6
| 566291 ||  || — || November 9, 2007 || Kitt Peak || Spacewatch ||  || align=right | 2.5 km || 
|-id=292 bgcolor=#d6d6d6
| 566292 ||  || — || September 15, 2007 || Mount Lemmon || Mount Lemmon Survey ||  || align=right | 2.3 km || 
|-id=293 bgcolor=#fefefe
| 566293 ||  || — || October 11, 2010 || Mount Lemmon || Mount Lemmon Survey ||  || align=right data-sort-value="0.47" | 470 m || 
|-id=294 bgcolor=#d6d6d6
| 566294 ||  || — || October 18, 2012 || Mount Lemmon || Mount Lemmon Survey ||  || align=right | 2.6 km || 
|-id=295 bgcolor=#d6d6d6
| 566295 ||  || — || March 15, 2016 || Haleakala || Pan-STARRS ||  || align=right | 2.6 km || 
|-id=296 bgcolor=#d6d6d6
| 566296 ||  || — || September 21, 2012 || Kitt Peak || Spacewatch ||  || align=right | 2.2 km || 
|-id=297 bgcolor=#d6d6d6
| 566297 ||  || — || October 20, 2006 || Mount Lemmon || Mount Lemmon Survey ||  || align=right | 2.9 km || 
|-id=298 bgcolor=#d6d6d6
| 566298 ||  || — || September 18, 2001 || Kitt Peak || SDSS ||  || align=right | 2.8 km || 
|-id=299 bgcolor=#d6d6d6
| 566299 ||  || — || July 9, 2005 || Kitt Peak || Spacewatch ||  || align=right | 2.5 km || 
|-id=300 bgcolor=#d6d6d6
| 566300 ||  || — || July 3, 2005 || Palomar || NEAT ||  || align=right | 3.2 km || 
|}

566301–566400 

|-bgcolor=#E9E9E9
| 566301 ||  || — || July 4, 2003 || Kitt Peak || Spacewatch ||  || align=right | 2.5 km || 
|-id=302 bgcolor=#d6d6d6
| 566302 ||  || — || November 19, 2007 || Kitt Peak || Spacewatch ||  || align=right | 2.3 km || 
|-id=303 bgcolor=#d6d6d6
| 566303 ||  || — || May 16, 2010 || Mount Lemmon || Mount Lemmon Survey ||  || align=right | 2.7 km || 
|-id=304 bgcolor=#d6d6d6
| 566304 ||  || — || February 16, 2015 || Haleakala || Pan-STARRS ||  || align=right | 2.0 km || 
|-id=305 bgcolor=#d6d6d6
| 566305 ||  || — || December 30, 2007 || Kitt Peak || Spacewatch ||  || align=right | 2.6 km || 
|-id=306 bgcolor=#d6d6d6
| 566306 ||  || — || November 8, 2008 || Kitt Peak || Spacewatch ||  || align=right | 2.3 km || 
|-id=307 bgcolor=#d6d6d6
| 566307 ||  || — || December 4, 2012 || Mount Lemmon || Mount Lemmon Survey ||  || align=right | 2.2 km || 
|-id=308 bgcolor=#d6d6d6
| 566308 ||  || — || October 20, 2006 || Mount Lemmon || Mount Lemmon Survey ||  || align=right | 3.1 km || 
|-id=309 bgcolor=#d6d6d6
| 566309 ||  || — || October 10, 2012 || Haleakala || Pan-STARRS ||  || align=right | 2.7 km || 
|-id=310 bgcolor=#d6d6d6
| 566310 ||  || — || September 27, 2006 || Mount Lemmon || Mount Lemmon Survey ||  || align=right | 3.5 km || 
|-id=311 bgcolor=#d6d6d6
| 566311 ||  || — || September 28, 2006 || Catalina || CSS ||  || align=right | 2.4 km || 
|-id=312 bgcolor=#d6d6d6
| 566312 ||  || — || October 21, 2001 || Socorro || LINEAR ||  || align=right | 2.4 km || 
|-id=313 bgcolor=#d6d6d6
| 566313 ||  || — || January 23, 2015 || Haleakala || Pan-STARRS ||  || align=right | 1.9 km || 
|-id=314 bgcolor=#d6d6d6
| 566314 ||  || — || October 8, 2012 || Mount Lemmon || Mount Lemmon Survey ||  || align=right | 2.5 km || 
|-id=315 bgcolor=#E9E9E9
| 566315 ||  || — || April 20, 2007 || Kitt Peak || Spacewatch ||  || align=right | 2.5 km || 
|-id=316 bgcolor=#d6d6d6
| 566316 ||  || — || August 21, 2006 || Kitt Peak || Spacewatch ||  || align=right | 2.4 km || 
|-id=317 bgcolor=#d6d6d6
| 566317 ||  || — || October 18, 2012 || Haleakala || Pan-STARRS ||  || align=right | 2.2 km || 
|-id=318 bgcolor=#d6d6d6
| 566318 ||  || — || October 8, 2012 || Haleakala || Pan-STARRS ||  || align=right | 2.8 km || 
|-id=319 bgcolor=#d6d6d6
| 566319 ||  || — || October 18, 2012 || Haleakala || Pan-STARRS ||  || align=right | 2.7 km || 
|-id=320 bgcolor=#d6d6d6
| 566320 ||  || — || August 28, 2011 || Haleakala || Pan-STARRS ||  || align=right | 4.0 km || 
|-id=321 bgcolor=#E9E9E9
| 566321 ||  || — || July 27, 2003 || Reedy Creek || J. Broughton ||  || align=right | 1.8 km || 
|-id=322 bgcolor=#d6d6d6
| 566322 ||  || — || October 2, 2006 || Mount Lemmon || Mount Lemmon Survey ||  || align=right | 2.6 km || 
|-id=323 bgcolor=#E9E9E9
| 566323 ||  || — || February 25, 2011 || Mount Lemmon || Mount Lemmon Survey ||  || align=right | 1.8 km || 
|-id=324 bgcolor=#d6d6d6
| 566324 ||  || — || August 17, 2006 || Palomar || NEAT ||  || align=right | 2.7 km || 
|-id=325 bgcolor=#d6d6d6
| 566325 ||  || — || September 26, 2006 || Mount Lemmon || Mount Lemmon Survey ||  || align=right | 2.7 km || 
|-id=326 bgcolor=#d6d6d6
| 566326 ||  || — || September 18, 2012 || Kitt Peak || Spacewatch ||  || align=right | 2.3 km || 
|-id=327 bgcolor=#d6d6d6
| 566327 ||  || — || September 27, 2006 || Kitt Peak || Spacewatch ||  || align=right | 2.7 km || 
|-id=328 bgcolor=#E9E9E9
| 566328 ||  || — || October 23, 2003 || Kitt Peak || Spacewatch ||  || align=right | 2.6 km || 
|-id=329 bgcolor=#d6d6d6
| 566329 ||  || — || April 13, 2004 || Kitt Peak || Spacewatch ||  || align=right | 3.0 km || 
|-id=330 bgcolor=#d6d6d6
| 566330 ||  || — || January 28, 2014 || Mount Lemmon || Mount Lemmon Survey ||  || align=right | 2.7 km || 
|-id=331 bgcolor=#d6d6d6
| 566331 ||  || — || March 8, 2005 || Mount Lemmon || Mount Lemmon Survey ||  || align=right | 1.9 km || 
|-id=332 bgcolor=#E9E9E9
| 566332 ||  || — || May 28, 2012 || Mount Lemmon || Mount Lemmon Survey ||  || align=right | 1.1 km || 
|-id=333 bgcolor=#d6d6d6
| 566333 ||  || — || October 2, 2006 || Mount Lemmon || Mount Lemmon Survey ||  || align=right | 2.6 km || 
|-id=334 bgcolor=#d6d6d6
| 566334 ||  || — || October 16, 2012 || Mount Lemmon || Mount Lemmon Survey ||  || align=right | 2.5 km || 
|-id=335 bgcolor=#d6d6d6
| 566335 ||  || — || September 12, 2007 || Mount Lemmon || Mount Lemmon Survey ||  || align=right | 2.1 km || 
|-id=336 bgcolor=#d6d6d6
| 566336 ||  || — || March 17, 2004 || Kitt Peak || Spacewatch ||  || align=right | 2.2 km || 
|-id=337 bgcolor=#d6d6d6
| 566337 ||  || — || October 19, 2006 || Kitt Peak || L. H. Wasserman ||  || align=right | 2.4 km || 
|-id=338 bgcolor=#d6d6d6
| 566338 ||  || — || August 24, 2006 || Palomar || NEAT ||  || align=right | 2.7 km || 
|-id=339 bgcolor=#d6d6d6
| 566339 ||  || — || October 2, 2006 || Mount Lemmon || Mount Lemmon Survey ||  || align=right | 2.5 km || 
|-id=340 bgcolor=#d6d6d6
| 566340 ||  || — || August 2, 2011 || Haleakala || Pan-STARRS ||  || align=right | 2.7 km || 
|-id=341 bgcolor=#d6d6d6
| 566341 ||  || — || September 21, 2011 || Mount Lemmon || Mount Lemmon Survey ||  || align=right | 2.2 km || 
|-id=342 bgcolor=#d6d6d6
| 566342 ||  || — || March 20, 2010 || Kitt Peak || Spacewatch ||  || align=right | 2.2 km || 
|-id=343 bgcolor=#d6d6d6
| 566343 ||  || — || October 2, 2006 || Mount Lemmon || Mount Lemmon Survey ||  || align=right | 2.4 km || 
|-id=344 bgcolor=#d6d6d6
| 566344 ||  || — || October 20, 2007 || Kitt Peak || Spacewatch ||  || align=right | 2.2 km || 
|-id=345 bgcolor=#d6d6d6
| 566345 ||  || — || November 7, 2012 || Mount Lemmon || Mount Lemmon Survey ||  || align=right | 2.3 km || 
|-id=346 bgcolor=#d6d6d6
| 566346 ||  || — || February 15, 2010 || Kitt Peak || Spacewatch ||  || align=right | 2.5 km || 
|-id=347 bgcolor=#d6d6d6
| 566347 ||  || — || October 9, 2007 || Mount Lemmon || Mount Lemmon Survey ||  || align=right | 2.3 km || 
|-id=348 bgcolor=#d6d6d6
| 566348 ||  || — || August 20, 2017 || Haleakala || Pan-STARRS ||  || align=right | 2.7 km || 
|-id=349 bgcolor=#d6d6d6
| 566349 ||  || — || May 10, 2010 || Mount Lemmon || Mount Lemmon Survey ||  || align=right | 2.5 km || 
|-id=350 bgcolor=#d6d6d6
| 566350 ||  || — || February 6, 2007 || Mount Lemmon || Mount Lemmon Survey || 7:4 || align=right | 3.0 km || 
|-id=351 bgcolor=#d6d6d6
| 566351 ||  || — || July 28, 2005 || Palomar || NEAT ||  || align=right | 4.4 km || 
|-id=352 bgcolor=#d6d6d6
| 566352 ||  || — || August 2, 2011 || Haleakala || Pan-STARRS ||  || align=right | 3.3 km || 
|-id=353 bgcolor=#d6d6d6
| 566353 ||  || — || September 23, 2000 || Kitt Peak || Spacewatch ||  || align=right | 3.2 km || 
|-id=354 bgcolor=#FA8072
| 566354 ||  || — || November 2, 2010 || Mount Lemmon || Mount Lemmon Survey ||  || align=right data-sort-value="0.76" | 760 m || 
|-id=355 bgcolor=#E9E9E9
| 566355 ||  || — || January 14, 2016 || Haleakala || Pan-STARRS ||  || align=right | 1.8 km || 
|-id=356 bgcolor=#d6d6d6
| 566356 ||  || — || February 16, 2010 || Mount Lemmon || Mount Lemmon Survey ||  || align=right | 2.5 km || 
|-id=357 bgcolor=#d6d6d6
| 566357 ||  || — || April 9, 2003 || Kitt Peak || Spacewatch ||  || align=right | 4.2 km || 
|-id=358 bgcolor=#d6d6d6
| 566358 ||  || — || September 7, 2000 || Kitt Peak || Spacewatch ||  || align=right | 3.3 km || 
|-id=359 bgcolor=#E9E9E9
| 566359 ||  || — || May 3, 2008 || Kitt Peak || Spacewatch ||  || align=right | 1.2 km || 
|-id=360 bgcolor=#E9E9E9
| 566360 ||  || — || July 28, 2008 || Mount Lemmon || Mount Lemmon Survey ||  || align=right | 1.3 km || 
|-id=361 bgcolor=#fefefe
| 566361 ||  || — || November 8, 2010 || Catalina || CSS ||  || align=right data-sort-value="0.81" | 810 m || 
|-id=362 bgcolor=#d6d6d6
| 566362 ||  || — || October 19, 2006 || Catalina || CSS ||  || align=right | 3.1 km || 
|-id=363 bgcolor=#E9E9E9
| 566363 ||  || — || August 27, 2017 || XuYi || PMO NEO ||  || align=right data-sort-value="0.87" | 870 m || 
|-id=364 bgcolor=#d6d6d6
| 566364 ||  || — || April 11, 2010 || Mount Lemmon || Mount Lemmon Survey ||  || align=right | 2.4 km || 
|-id=365 bgcolor=#d6d6d6
| 566365 ||  || — || February 20, 2014 || Mount Lemmon || Mount Lemmon Survey ||  || align=right | 2.8 km || 
|-id=366 bgcolor=#d6d6d6
| 566366 ||  || — || March 15, 2016 || Kitt Peak || Pan-STARRS ||  || align=right | 2.2 km || 
|-id=367 bgcolor=#E9E9E9
| 566367 ||  || — || September 25, 2003 || Palomar || NEAT ||  || align=right | 2.3 km || 
|-id=368 bgcolor=#d6d6d6
| 566368 ||  || — || January 31, 2009 || Kitt Peak || Spacewatch ||  || align=right | 2.2 km || 
|-id=369 bgcolor=#d6d6d6
| 566369 ||  || — || September 26, 2017 || Haleakala || Pan-STARRS ||  || align=right | 2.4 km || 
|-id=370 bgcolor=#d6d6d6
| 566370 ||  || — || June 8, 2016 || Haleakala || Pan-STARRS ||  || align=right | 2.3 km || 
|-id=371 bgcolor=#d6d6d6
| 566371 ||  || — || December 15, 2001 || Apache Point || SDSS Collaboration ||  || align=right | 4.2 km || 
|-id=372 bgcolor=#d6d6d6
| 566372 ||  || — || January 16, 2015 || Haleakala || Pan-STARRS ||  || align=right | 3.2 km || 
|-id=373 bgcolor=#d6d6d6
| 566373 ||  || — || October 23, 2006 || Nashville || R. Clingan ||  || align=right | 2.6 km || 
|-id=374 bgcolor=#E9E9E9
| 566374 ||  || — || December 1, 2004 || Palomar || NEAT ||  || align=right | 1.7 km || 
|-id=375 bgcolor=#fefefe
| 566375 ||  || — || November 7, 2012 || Haleakala || Pan-STARRS || H || align=right data-sort-value="0.66" | 660 m || 
|-id=376 bgcolor=#d6d6d6
| 566376 ||  || — || December 9, 2012 || Haleakala || Pan-STARRS ||  || align=right | 2.6 km || 
|-id=377 bgcolor=#d6d6d6
| 566377 ||  || — || August 24, 2011 || Haleakala || Pan-STARRS ||  || align=right | 2.7 km || 
|-id=378 bgcolor=#d6d6d6
| 566378 ||  || — || August 28, 2012 || Mount Lemmon || Mount Lemmon Survey ||  || align=right | 2.7 km || 
|-id=379 bgcolor=#E9E9E9
| 566379 ||  || — || October 15, 2004 || Kitt Peak || Spacewatch ||  || align=right | 1.2 km || 
|-id=380 bgcolor=#d6d6d6
| 566380 ||  || — || October 1, 2005 || Kitt Peak || Spacewatch || 7:4 || align=right | 2.9 km || 
|-id=381 bgcolor=#E9E9E9
| 566381 ||  || — || April 24, 2012 || Haleakala || Pan-STARRS ||  || align=right | 1.3 km || 
|-id=382 bgcolor=#d6d6d6
| 566382 ||  || — || September 25, 2006 || Mount Lemmon || Mount Lemmon Survey ||  || align=right | 2.3 km || 
|-id=383 bgcolor=#d6d6d6
| 566383 ||  || — || March 13, 2010 || Kitt Peak || Spacewatch ||  || align=right | 2.4 km || 
|-id=384 bgcolor=#d6d6d6
| 566384 ||  || — || September 19, 2006 || Kitt Peak || Spacewatch ||  || align=right | 2.5 km || 
|-id=385 bgcolor=#d6d6d6
| 566385 ||  || — || October 21, 2012 || Kitt Peak || Spacewatch ||  || align=right | 2.8 km || 
|-id=386 bgcolor=#d6d6d6
| 566386 ||  || — || October 7, 2012 || Haleakala || Pan-STARRS ||  || align=right | 2.3 km || 
|-id=387 bgcolor=#E9E9E9
| 566387 ||  || — || February 27, 2006 || Kitt Peak || Spacewatch ||  || align=right | 2.2 km || 
|-id=388 bgcolor=#d6d6d6
| 566388 ||  || — || September 5, 2000 || Kitt Peak || SDSS ||  || align=right | 3.3 km || 
|-id=389 bgcolor=#d6d6d6
| 566389 ||  || — || December 5, 2012 || Mount Lemmon || Mount Lemmon Survey ||  || align=right | 2.7 km || 
|-id=390 bgcolor=#d6d6d6
| 566390 ||  || — || November 11, 2001 || Apache Point || SDSS Collaboration ||  || align=right | 2.8 km || 
|-id=391 bgcolor=#d6d6d6
| 566391 ||  || — || September 4, 2011 || Kitt Peak || Spacewatch ||  || align=right | 2.7 km || 
|-id=392 bgcolor=#d6d6d6
| 566392 ||  || — || October 15, 2001 || Apache Point || SDSS Collaboration ||  || align=right | 2.1 km || 
|-id=393 bgcolor=#d6d6d6
| 566393 ||  || — || September 18, 2006 || Kitt Peak || Spacewatch ||  || align=right | 2.5 km || 
|-id=394 bgcolor=#d6d6d6
| 566394 ||  || — || March 21, 2015 || Haleakala || Pan-STARRS ||  || align=right | 2.8 km || 
|-id=395 bgcolor=#d6d6d6
| 566395 ||  || — || October 12, 2006 || Kitt Peak || Spacewatch ||  || align=right | 2.5 km || 
|-id=396 bgcolor=#E9E9E9
| 566396 ||  || — || February 14, 2016 || Haleakala || Pan-STARRS ||  || align=right | 2.3 km || 
|-id=397 bgcolor=#FA8072
| 566397 ||  || — || April 14, 2002 || Kitt Peak || Spacewatch || H || align=right data-sort-value="0.55" | 550 m || 
|-id=398 bgcolor=#fefefe
| 566398 ||  || — || October 22, 2017 || Mount Lemmon || Mount Lemmon Survey ||  || align=right data-sort-value="0.40" | 400 m || 
|-id=399 bgcolor=#fefefe
| 566399 ||  || — || May 30, 2016 || Haleakala || Pan-STARRS || H || align=right data-sort-value="0.83" | 830 m || 
|-id=400 bgcolor=#FA8072
| 566400 ||  || — || February 3, 2016 || Haleakala || Pan-STARRS || H || align=right data-sort-value="0.69" | 690 m || 
|}

566401–566500 

|-bgcolor=#d6d6d6
| 566401 ||  || — || February 1, 2009 || Kitt Peak || Spacewatch ||  || align=right | 2.7 km || 
|-id=402 bgcolor=#E9E9E9
| 566402 ||  || — || October 1, 2003 || Anderson Mesa || LONEOS ||  || align=right | 2.2 km || 
|-id=403 bgcolor=#d6d6d6
| 566403 ||  || — || October 19, 2006 || Kitt Peak || Spacewatch ||  || align=right | 2.8 km || 
|-id=404 bgcolor=#d6d6d6
| 566404 ||  || — || September 29, 2011 || Mount Lemmon || Mount Lemmon Survey ||  || align=right | 2.8 km || 
|-id=405 bgcolor=#d6d6d6
| 566405 ||  || — || September 26, 2006 || Catalina || CSS ||  || align=right | 3.2 km || 
|-id=406 bgcolor=#E9E9E9
| 566406 ||  || — || October 20, 2012 || Haleakala || Pan-STARRS ||  || align=right | 2.3 km || 
|-id=407 bgcolor=#fefefe
| 566407 ||  || — || December 9, 2015 || Haleakala || Pan-STARRS || H || align=right data-sort-value="0.50" | 500 m || 
|-id=408 bgcolor=#fefefe
| 566408 ||  || — || September 30, 2003 || Socorro || LINEAR || H || align=right data-sort-value="0.85" | 850 m || 
|-id=409 bgcolor=#d6d6d6
| 566409 ||  || — || October 4, 2011 || Crni Vrh || J. Zakrajšek ||  || align=right | 3.7 km || 
|-id=410 bgcolor=#d6d6d6
| 566410 ||  || — || October 12, 2006 || Palomar || NEAT ||  || align=right | 3.5 km || 
|-id=411 bgcolor=#d6d6d6
| 566411 ||  || — || January 15, 2007 || Mount Lemmon || Mauna Kea Obs. ||  || align=right | 3.3 km || 
|-id=412 bgcolor=#d6d6d6
| 566412 ||  || — || March 19, 2013 || Haleakala || Pan-STARRS || 3:2 || align=right | 4.4 km || 
|-id=413 bgcolor=#d6d6d6
| 566413 ||  || — || October 30, 2017 || Haleakala || Pan-STARRS || 3:2 || align=right | 3.0 km || 
|-id=414 bgcolor=#d6d6d6
| 566414 ||  || — || September 24, 2011 || Haleakala || Pan-STARRS || Tj (2.99) || align=right | 3.3 km || 
|-id=415 bgcolor=#d6d6d6
| 566415 ||  || — || November 24, 2006 || Mount Lemmon || Mount Lemmon Survey ||  || align=right | 2.4 km || 
|-id=416 bgcolor=#FA8072
| 566416 ||  || — || July 7, 2013 || La Sagra || OAM Obs. ||  || align=right data-sort-value="0.95" | 950 m || 
|-id=417 bgcolor=#d6d6d6
| 566417 ||  || — || December 15, 2012 || ESA OGS || ESA OGS ||  || align=right | 3.5 km || 
|-id=418 bgcolor=#d6d6d6
| 566418 ||  || — || September 1, 2011 || Siding Spring || SSS || Tj (2.97) || align=right | 4.1 km || 
|-id=419 bgcolor=#fefefe
| 566419 ||  || — || January 17, 2007 || Catalina || CSS || H || align=right data-sort-value="0.80" | 800 m || 
|-id=420 bgcolor=#fefefe
| 566420 ||  || — || March 19, 2010 || Catalina || CSS || H || align=right data-sort-value="0.87" | 870 m || 
|-id=421 bgcolor=#fefefe
| 566421 ||  || — || October 2, 2017 || Mount Lemmon || Mount Lemmon Survey || H || align=right data-sort-value="0.74" | 740 m || 
|-id=422 bgcolor=#fefefe
| 566422 ||  || — || April 14, 2008 || Mount Lemmon || Mount Lemmon Survey || H || align=right data-sort-value="0.54" | 540 m || 
|-id=423 bgcolor=#fefefe
| 566423 ||  || — || February 6, 2013 || Kitt Peak || Spacewatch || H || align=right data-sort-value="0.57" | 570 m || 
|-id=424 bgcolor=#fefefe
| 566424 ||  || — || August 27, 2003 || Palomar || NEAT || H || align=right data-sort-value="0.63" | 630 m || 
|-id=425 bgcolor=#fefefe
| 566425 ||  || — || November 19, 2017 || Haleakala || Pan-STARRS ||  || align=right data-sort-value="0.59" | 590 m || 
|-id=426 bgcolor=#fefefe
| 566426 ||  || — || January 22, 2015 || Haleakala || Pan-STARRS || H || align=right data-sort-value="0.63" | 630 m || 
|-id=427 bgcolor=#fefefe
| 566427 ||  || — || July 10, 2005 || Kitt Peak || Spacewatch || H || align=right data-sort-value="0.61" | 610 m || 
|-id=428 bgcolor=#fefefe
| 566428 ||  || — || January 19, 2015 || Haleakala || Pan-STARRS || H || align=right data-sort-value="0.64" | 640 m || 
|-id=429 bgcolor=#fefefe
| 566429 ||  || — || December 3, 2004 || Kitt Peak || Spacewatch || H || align=right data-sort-value="0.76" | 760 m || 
|-id=430 bgcolor=#fefefe
| 566430 ||  || — || February 14, 2008 || Siding Spring || SSS || H || align=right data-sort-value="0.94" | 940 m || 
|-id=431 bgcolor=#fefefe
| 566431 ||  || — || September 19, 2011 || Catalina || CSS || H || align=right data-sort-value="0.71" | 710 m || 
|-id=432 bgcolor=#fefefe
| 566432 ||  || — || August 24, 2011 || Haleakala || Pan-STARRS || H || align=right data-sort-value="0.53" | 530 m || 
|-id=433 bgcolor=#fefefe
| 566433 ||  || — || April 29, 2008 || Mount Lemmon || Mount Lemmon Survey ||  || align=right data-sort-value="0.78" | 780 m || 
|-id=434 bgcolor=#fefefe
| 566434 ||  || — || November 21, 2009 || Mount Lemmon || Mount Lemmon Survey || H || align=right data-sort-value="0.65" | 650 m || 
|-id=435 bgcolor=#fefefe
| 566435 ||  || — || May 20, 2003 || Anderson Mesa || LONEOS || H || align=right data-sort-value="0.74" | 740 m || 
|-id=436 bgcolor=#fefefe
| 566436 ||  || — || November 28, 2017 || Mount Lemmon || Mount Lemmon Survey || H || align=right data-sort-value="0.70" | 700 m || 
|-id=437 bgcolor=#fefefe
| 566437 ||  || — || August 23, 2008 || Siding Spring || SSS || H || align=right data-sort-value="0.77" | 770 m || 
|-id=438 bgcolor=#fefefe
| 566438 ||  || — || August 18, 2014 || Haleakala || Pan-STARRS || H || align=right data-sort-value="0.64" | 640 m || 
|-id=439 bgcolor=#FA8072
| 566439 ||  || — || September 16, 2014 || Haleakala || Pan-STARRS || H || align=right data-sort-value="0.60" | 600 m || 
|-id=440 bgcolor=#fefefe
| 566440 ||  || — || October 2, 2011 || Haleakala || Pan-STARRS || H || align=right data-sort-value="0.64" | 640 m || 
|-id=441 bgcolor=#fefefe
| 566441 ||  || — || November 23, 2014 || Haleakala || Pan-STARRS || H || align=right data-sort-value="0.50" | 500 m || 
|-id=442 bgcolor=#C7FF8F
| 566442 ||  || — || March 7, 2018 || Haleakala || Pan-STARRS || centaur || align=right | 22 km || 
|-id=443 bgcolor=#fefefe
| 566443 ||  || — || September 24, 2011 || Catalina || CSS || H || align=right data-sort-value="0.48" | 480 m || 
|-id=444 bgcolor=#E9E9E9
| 566444 ||  || — || May 25, 2007 || Mount Lemmon || Mount Lemmon Survey ||  || align=right data-sort-value="0.95" | 950 m || 
|-id=445 bgcolor=#fefefe
| 566445 ||  || — || July 30, 2005 || Palomar || NEAT || H || align=right data-sort-value="0.77" | 770 m || 
|-id=446 bgcolor=#fefefe
| 566446 ||  || — || February 8, 2010 || La Silla || D. Megevand || H || align=right data-sort-value="0.66" | 660 m || 
|-id=447 bgcolor=#fefefe
| 566447 ||  || — || April 29, 2013 || Palomar || Pan-STARRS || H || align=right data-sort-value="0.55" | 550 m || 
|-id=448 bgcolor=#fefefe
| 566448 ||  || — || October 3, 2011 || Catalina || CSS || H || align=right data-sort-value="0.73" | 730 m || 
|-id=449 bgcolor=#FA8072
| 566449 ||  || — || December 18, 2014 || Haleakala || Pan-STARRS || H || align=right data-sort-value="0.54" | 540 m || 
|-id=450 bgcolor=#fefefe
| 566450 ||  || — || March 10, 2011 || Kitt Peak || Spacewatch ||  || align=right data-sort-value="0.61" | 610 m || 
|-id=451 bgcolor=#fefefe
| 566451 ||  || — || August 8, 2004 || Anderson Mesa || LONEOS ||  || align=right data-sort-value="0.80" | 800 m || 
|-id=452 bgcolor=#E9E9E9
| 566452 ||  || — || May 7, 2014 || Haleakala || Pan-STARRS ||  || align=right | 1.5 km || 
|-id=453 bgcolor=#fefefe
| 566453 ||  || — || January 24, 2015 || Haleakala || Pan-STARRS || H || align=right data-sort-value="0.51" | 510 m || 
|-id=454 bgcolor=#fefefe
| 566454 ||  || — || July 28, 2015 || Haleakala || Pan-STARRS ||  || align=right data-sort-value="0.65" | 650 m || 
|-id=455 bgcolor=#fefefe
| 566455 ||  || — || May 4, 2005 || Kitt Peak || Spacewatch ||  || align=right data-sort-value="0.63" | 630 m || 
|-id=456 bgcolor=#fefefe
| 566456 ||  || — || September 28, 2006 || Kitt Peak || Spacewatch ||  || align=right data-sort-value="0.81" | 810 m || 
|-id=457 bgcolor=#fefefe
| 566457 ||  || — || October 16, 2003 || Kitt Peak || Spacewatch ||  || align=right data-sort-value="0.80" | 800 m || 
|-id=458 bgcolor=#fefefe
| 566458 ||  || — || May 7, 2007 || Kitt Peak || Spacewatch ||  || align=right data-sort-value="0.73" | 730 m || 
|-id=459 bgcolor=#FA8072
| 566459 ||  || — || September 30, 2009 || Mount Lemmon || Mount Lemmon Survey || H || align=right data-sort-value="0.67" | 670 m || 
|-id=460 bgcolor=#FA8072
| 566460 ||  || — || March 3, 2005 || Socorro || LINEAR ||  || align=right data-sort-value="0.51" | 510 m || 
|-id=461 bgcolor=#fefefe
| 566461 ||  || — || January 20, 2015 || Haleakala || Pan-STARRS || H || align=right data-sort-value="0.54" | 540 m || 
|-id=462 bgcolor=#d6d6d6
| 566462 ||  || — || March 13, 2012 || Kitt Peak || Spacewatch ||  || align=right | 2.4 km || 
|-id=463 bgcolor=#FA8072
| 566463 ||  || — || March 8, 2008 || Mount Lemmon || Mount Lemmon Survey ||  || align=right data-sort-value="0.52" | 520 m || 
|-id=464 bgcolor=#fefefe
| 566464 ||  || — || August 29, 2005 || Kitt Peak || Spacewatch ||  || align=right data-sort-value="0.74" | 740 m || 
|-id=465 bgcolor=#fefefe
| 566465 ||  || — || September 25, 2009 || Kitt Peak || Spacewatch ||  || align=right data-sort-value="0.50" | 500 m || 
|-id=466 bgcolor=#fefefe
| 566466 ||  || — || April 11, 2007 || Catalina || CSS ||  || align=right | 1.5 km || 
|-id=467 bgcolor=#FA8072
| 566467 ||  || — || September 21, 2016 || Haleakala || Pan-STARRS || H || align=right data-sort-value="0.67" | 670 m || 
|-id=468 bgcolor=#fefefe
| 566468 ||  || — || March 4, 2005 || Kitt Peak || Spacewatch || H || align=right data-sort-value="0.62" | 620 m || 
|-id=469 bgcolor=#FA8072
| 566469 ||  || — || November 16, 2006 || Kitt Peak || Spacewatch ||  || align=right data-sort-value="0.71" | 710 m || 
|-id=470 bgcolor=#FA8072
| 566470 ||  || — || July 20, 2012 || Siding Spring || SSS ||  || align=right data-sort-value="0.66" | 660 m || 
|-id=471 bgcolor=#fefefe
| 566471 ||  || — || February 26, 2011 || Catalina || CSS ||  || align=right data-sort-value="0.74" | 740 m || 
|-id=472 bgcolor=#fefefe
| 566472 ||  || — || June 3, 2011 || Mount Lemmon || Mount Lemmon Survey ||  || align=right data-sort-value="0.77" | 770 m || 
|-id=473 bgcolor=#fefefe
| 566473 ||  || — || May 13, 2018 || Mount Lemmon || Mount Lemmon Survey || H || align=right data-sort-value="0.65" | 650 m || 
|-id=474 bgcolor=#FA8072
| 566474 ||  || — || September 25, 2005 || Kitt Peak || Spacewatch ||  || align=right data-sort-value="0.53" | 530 m || 
|-id=475 bgcolor=#FA8072
| 566475 ||  || — || November 19, 2014 || Catalina || CSS ||  || align=right | 1.1 km || 
|-id=476 bgcolor=#fefefe
| 566476 ||  || — || September 29, 2009 || Mount Lemmon || Mount Lemmon Survey ||  || align=right data-sort-value="0.74" | 740 m || 
|-id=477 bgcolor=#FA8072
| 566477 ||  || — || June 13, 2002 || Palomar || NEAT ||  || align=right | 1.5 km || 
|-id=478 bgcolor=#fefefe
| 566478 ||  || — || December 19, 2009 || Kitt Peak || Spacewatch ||  || align=right data-sort-value="0.97" | 970 m || 
|-id=479 bgcolor=#fefefe
| 566479 ||  || — || April 5, 2014 || Haleakala || Pan-STARRS ||  || align=right data-sort-value="0.66" | 660 m || 
|-id=480 bgcolor=#E9E9E9
| 566480 ||  || — || March 14, 2013 || Kitt Peak || Spacewatch ||  || align=right | 1.7 km || 
|-id=481 bgcolor=#fefefe
| 566481 ||  || — || September 17, 2004 || Kitt Peak || Spacewatch ||  || align=right data-sort-value="0.60" | 600 m || 
|-id=482 bgcolor=#E9E9E9
| 566482 ||  || — || October 26, 2015 || Haleakala || Pan-STARRS ||  || align=right data-sort-value="0.89" | 890 m || 
|-id=483 bgcolor=#fefefe
| 566483 ||  || — || October 23, 2001 || Palomar || NEAT ||  || align=right data-sort-value="0.80" | 800 m || 
|-id=484 bgcolor=#fefefe
| 566484 ||  || — || September 7, 2008 || Catalina || CSS ||  || align=right data-sort-value="0.62" | 620 m || 
|-id=485 bgcolor=#fefefe
| 566485 ||  || — || February 12, 2008 || Mount Lemmon || Mount Lemmon Survey ||  || align=right data-sort-value="0.60" | 600 m || 
|-id=486 bgcolor=#fefefe
| 566486 ||  || — || September 9, 2015 || Haleakala || Pan-STARRS ||  || align=right data-sort-value="0.55" | 550 m || 
|-id=487 bgcolor=#fefefe
| 566487 ||  || — || May 3, 2000 || Socorro || LINEAR ||  || align=right | 1.1 km || 
|-id=488 bgcolor=#E9E9E9
| 566488 ||  || — || December 17, 1999 || Kitt Peak || Spacewatch ||  || align=right | 1.0 km || 
|-id=489 bgcolor=#fefefe
| 566489 ||  || — || June 24, 2014 || Mount Lemmon || Mount Lemmon Survey ||  || align=right data-sort-value="0.94" | 940 m || 
|-id=490 bgcolor=#fefefe
| 566490 ||  || — || October 9, 2008 || Mount Lemmon || Mount Lemmon Survey ||  || align=right data-sort-value="0.91" | 910 m || 
|-id=491 bgcolor=#FA8072
| 566491 ||  || — || November 6, 2005 || Kitt Peak || Spacewatch ||  || align=right data-sort-value="0.49" | 490 m || 
|-id=492 bgcolor=#fefefe
| 566492 ||  || — || October 25, 2005 || Kitt Peak || Spacewatch ||  || align=right | 1.5 km || 
|-id=493 bgcolor=#E9E9E9
| 566493 ||  || — || October 27, 2005 || Mount Lemmon || Mount Lemmon Survey ||  || align=right | 1.8 km || 
|-id=494 bgcolor=#E9E9E9
| 566494 ||  || — || December 1, 2006 || Mount Lemmon || Mount Lemmon Survey ||  || align=right | 1.8 km || 
|-id=495 bgcolor=#E9E9E9
| 566495 ||  || — || March 12, 2013 || Palomar || PTF ||  || align=right | 1.4 km || 
|-id=496 bgcolor=#fefefe
| 566496 ||  || — || November 4, 2005 || Kitt Peak || Spacewatch ||  || align=right data-sort-value="0.70" | 700 m || 
|-id=497 bgcolor=#fefefe
| 566497 ||  || — || October 28, 2008 || Kitt Peak || Spacewatch ||  || align=right data-sort-value="0.88" | 880 m || 
|-id=498 bgcolor=#fefefe
| 566498 ||  || — || January 1, 2009 || Mount Lemmon || Mount Lemmon Survey ||  || align=right data-sort-value="0.56" | 560 m || 
|-id=499 bgcolor=#fefefe
| 566499 ||  || — || May 24, 2011 || Nogales || M. Schwartz, P. R. Holvorcem ||  || align=right data-sort-value="0.69" | 690 m || 
|-id=500 bgcolor=#fefefe
| 566500 ||  || — || March 19, 2010 || Mount Lemmon || Mount Lemmon Survey ||  || align=right data-sort-value="0.89" | 890 m || 
|}

566501–566600 

|-bgcolor=#fefefe
| 566501 ||  || — || September 8, 2004 || Socorro || LINEAR ||  || align=right data-sort-value="0.67" | 670 m || 
|-id=502 bgcolor=#fefefe
| 566502 ||  || — || October 3, 2011 || Les Engarouines || L. Bernasconi ||  || align=right data-sort-value="0.94" | 940 m || 
|-id=503 bgcolor=#fefefe
| 566503 ||  || — || November 3, 2005 || Kitt Peak || Spacewatch ||  || align=right data-sort-value="0.62" | 620 m || 
|-id=504 bgcolor=#E9E9E9
| 566504 ||  || — || November 16, 2010 || Catalina || CSS ||  || align=right | 1.2 km || 
|-id=505 bgcolor=#fefefe
| 566505 ||  || — || July 10, 2018 || Haleakala || Pan-STARRS ||  || align=right data-sort-value="0.63" | 630 m || 
|-id=506 bgcolor=#fefefe
| 566506 ||  || — || September 4, 2011 || Haleakala || Pan-STARRS ||  || align=right data-sort-value="0.53" | 530 m || 
|-id=507 bgcolor=#fefefe
| 566507 ||  || — || October 18, 2011 || Catalina || CSS ||  || align=right data-sort-value="0.99" | 990 m || 
|-id=508 bgcolor=#fefefe
| 566508 ||  || — || August 26, 2011 || Haleakala || Pan-STARRS ||  || align=right data-sort-value="0.90" | 900 m || 
|-id=509 bgcolor=#fefefe
| 566509 ||  || — || May 21, 2010 || Nogales || M. Schwartz, P. R. Holvorcem ||  || align=right | 1.1 km || 
|-id=510 bgcolor=#fefefe
| 566510 ||  || — || August 23, 2007 || Kitt Peak || Spacewatch ||  || align=right data-sort-value="0.62" | 620 m || 
|-id=511 bgcolor=#fefefe
| 566511 ||  || — || September 26, 2011 || Haleakala || Pan-STARRS ||  || align=right data-sort-value="0.60" | 600 m || 
|-id=512 bgcolor=#fefefe
| 566512 ||  || — || June 16, 2018 || Haleakala || Pan-STARRS ||  || align=right data-sort-value="0.69" | 690 m || 
|-id=513 bgcolor=#E9E9E9
| 566513 ||  || — || April 15, 2008 || Mount Lemmon || Mount Lemmon Survey ||  || align=right | 1.2 km || 
|-id=514 bgcolor=#E9E9E9
| 566514 ||  || — || January 1, 2012 || Mount Lemmon || Mount Lemmon Survey ||  || align=right | 1.1 km || 
|-id=515 bgcolor=#E9E9E9
| 566515 ||  || — || December 30, 2007 || Kitt Peak || Spacewatch ||  || align=right data-sort-value="0.94" | 940 m || 
|-id=516 bgcolor=#d6d6d6
| 566516 ||  || — || September 4, 2003 || Kitt Peak || Spacewatch ||  || align=right | 2.0 km || 
|-id=517 bgcolor=#fefefe
| 566517 ||  || — || March 14, 2007 || Mount Lemmon || Mount Lemmon Survey ||  || align=right data-sort-value="0.68" | 680 m || 
|-id=518 bgcolor=#E9E9E9
| 566518 ||  || — || April 3, 2008 || Kitt Peak || Spacewatch ||  || align=right | 2.2 km || 
|-id=519 bgcolor=#E9E9E9
| 566519 ||  || — || April 18, 2013 || Mount Lemmon || Mount Lemmon Survey ||  || align=right | 1.0 km || 
|-id=520 bgcolor=#d6d6d6
| 566520 ||  || — || February 4, 2016 || Haleakala || Pan-STARRS ||  || align=right | 2.7 km || 
|-id=521 bgcolor=#d6d6d6
| 566521 ||  || — || February 3, 2016 || Haleakala || Pan-STARRS ||  || align=right | 2.8 km || 
|-id=522 bgcolor=#fefefe
| 566522 ||  || — || March 31, 2011 || Haleakala || Pan-STARRS ||  || align=right data-sort-value="0.53" | 530 m || 
|-id=523 bgcolor=#d6d6d6
| 566523 ||  || — || December 16, 2014 || Haleakala || Pan-STARRS ||  || align=right | 2.2 km || 
|-id=524 bgcolor=#d6d6d6
| 566524 ||  || — || August 11, 2007 || Charleston || R. Holmes ||  || align=right | 2.3 km || 
|-id=525 bgcolor=#E9E9E9
| 566525 ||  || — || October 8, 2010 || Kitt Peak || Spacewatch ||  || align=right | 1.2 km || 
|-id=526 bgcolor=#E9E9E9
| 566526 ||  || — || September 18, 2014 || Haleakala || Pan-STARRS ||  || align=right | 1.5 km || 
|-id=527 bgcolor=#E9E9E9
| 566527 ||  || — || February 1, 2016 || Haleakala || Pan-STARRS ||  || align=right | 1.2 km || 
|-id=528 bgcolor=#E9E9E9
| 566528 ||  || — || February 21, 2007 || Kitt Peak || Spacewatch ||  || align=right | 2.2 km || 
|-id=529 bgcolor=#d6d6d6
| 566529 ||  || — || August 7, 2018 || Kitt Peak || Pan-STARRS || 3:2 || align=right | 2.9 km || 
|-id=530 bgcolor=#fefefe
| 566530 ||  || — || July 2, 2014 || Mount Lemmon || Mount Lemmon Survey ||  || align=right data-sort-value="0.76" | 760 m || 
|-id=531 bgcolor=#E9E9E9
| 566531 ||  || — || August 12, 2018 || Haleakala || Pan-STARRS ||  || align=right | 1.2 km || 
|-id=532 bgcolor=#E9E9E9
| 566532 ||  || — || September 24, 2009 || Mount Lemmon || Mount Lemmon Survey ||  || align=right | 1.6 km || 
|-id=533 bgcolor=#E9E9E9
| 566533 ||  || — || November 20, 2006 || Kitt Peak || Spacewatch ||  || align=right data-sort-value="0.69" | 690 m || 
|-id=534 bgcolor=#E9E9E9
| 566534 ||  || — || November 20, 2014 || Haleakala || Pan-STARRS ||  || align=right data-sort-value="0.95" | 950 m || 
|-id=535 bgcolor=#fefefe
| 566535 ||  || — || October 14, 2001 || Socorro || LINEAR ||  || align=right data-sort-value="0.83" | 830 m || 
|-id=536 bgcolor=#fefefe
| 566536 ||  || — || July 2, 2011 || Kitt Peak || Spacewatch ||  || align=right data-sort-value="0.68" | 680 m || 
|-id=537 bgcolor=#fefefe
| 566537 ||  || — || August 12, 2004 || Palomar || NEAT ||  || align=right data-sort-value="0.98" | 980 m || 
|-id=538 bgcolor=#E9E9E9
| 566538 ||  || — || August 25, 2014 || Haleakala || Pan-STARRS ||  || align=right data-sort-value="0.87" | 870 m || 
|-id=539 bgcolor=#E9E9E9
| 566539 ||  || — || October 18, 2001 || Kitt Peak || Spacewatch ||  || align=right | 1.4 km || 
|-id=540 bgcolor=#FFC2E0
| 566540 ||  || — || September 8, 2018 || XuYi || PMO NEO || APO || align=right data-sort-value="0.17" | 170 m || 
|-id=541 bgcolor=#E9E9E9
| 566541 ||  || — || December 24, 2005 || Kitt Peak || Spacewatch ||  || align=right | 1.8 km || 
|-id=542 bgcolor=#E9E9E9
| 566542 ||  || — || July 15, 2018 || XuYi || PMO NEO ||  || align=right | 1.4 km || 
|-id=543 bgcolor=#fefefe
| 566543 ||  || — || November 19, 2007 || Kitt Peak || Spacewatch ||  || align=right data-sort-value="0.67" | 670 m || 
|-id=544 bgcolor=#fefefe
| 566544 ||  || — || February 4, 2009 || Mount Lemmon || Mount Lemmon Survey ||  || align=right data-sort-value="0.95" | 950 m || 
|-id=545 bgcolor=#d6d6d6
| 566545 ||  || — || September 28, 2013 || Mount Lemmon || Mount Lemmon Survey ||  || align=right | 2.0 km || 
|-id=546 bgcolor=#E9E9E9
| 566546 ||  || — || August 17, 2018 || Haleakala || Pan-STARRS ||  || align=right | 1.8 km || 
|-id=547 bgcolor=#E9E9E9
| 566547 ||  || — || August 26, 2001 || Palomar || NEAT ||  || align=right | 1.0 km || 
|-id=548 bgcolor=#d6d6d6
| 566548 ||  || — || October 1, 2002 || Haleakala || AMOS ||  || align=right | 2.4 km || 
|-id=549 bgcolor=#E9E9E9
| 566549 ||  || — || December 20, 2014 || Haleakala || Pan-STARRS ||  || align=right | 1.3 km || 
|-id=550 bgcolor=#E9E9E9
| 566550 ||  || — || August 6, 2005 || Palomar || NEAT ||  || align=right | 2.1 km || 
|-id=551 bgcolor=#E9E9E9
| 566551 ||  || — || September 11, 2010 || Mount Lemmon || Mount Lemmon Survey ||  || align=right | 1.2 km || 
|-id=552 bgcolor=#fefefe
| 566552 ||  || — || September 18, 2007 || Kitt Peak || Spacewatch ||  || align=right data-sort-value="0.59" | 590 m || 
|-id=553 bgcolor=#E9E9E9
| 566553 ||  || — || September 30, 2009 || Mount Lemmon || Mount Lemmon Survey ||  || align=right | 2.1 km || 
|-id=554 bgcolor=#E9E9E9
| 566554 ||  || — || November 1, 2006 || Mount Lemmon || Mount Lemmon Survey ||  || align=right | 1.1 km || 
|-id=555 bgcolor=#E9E9E9
| 566555 ||  || — || January 25, 2007 || Kitt Peak || Spacewatch ||  || align=right | 1.6 km || 
|-id=556 bgcolor=#d6d6d6
| 566556 ||  || — || July 13, 2013 || Haleakala || Pan-STARRS ||  || align=right | 2.7 km || 
|-id=557 bgcolor=#fefefe
| 566557 ||  || — || September 9, 2008 || Mount Lemmon || Mount Lemmon Survey ||  || align=right data-sort-value="0.72" | 720 m || 
|-id=558 bgcolor=#fefefe
| 566558 ||  || — || October 1, 2000 || Socorro || LINEAR ||  || align=right data-sort-value="0.69" | 690 m || 
|-id=559 bgcolor=#fefefe
| 566559 ||  || — || September 14, 2007 || Mount Lemmon || Mount Lemmon Survey ||  || align=right data-sort-value="0.81" | 810 m || 
|-id=560 bgcolor=#d6d6d6
| 566560 ||  || — || December 20, 2009 || Mount Lemmon || Mount Lemmon Survey ||  || align=right | 2.4 km || 
|-id=561 bgcolor=#fefefe
| 566561 ||  || — || January 11, 2000 || Kitt Peak || Spacewatch ||  || align=right data-sort-value="0.89" | 890 m || 
|-id=562 bgcolor=#d6d6d6
| 566562 ||  || — || June 17, 2006 || Kitt Peak || Spacewatch ||  || align=right | 3.0 km || 
|-id=563 bgcolor=#d6d6d6
| 566563 ||  || — || April 25, 2007 || Kitt Peak || Spacewatch ||  || align=right | 3.0 km || 
|-id=564 bgcolor=#d6d6d6
| 566564 ||  || — || April 2, 2011 || Mount Lemmon || Mount Lemmon Survey ||  || align=right | 2.6 km || 
|-id=565 bgcolor=#d6d6d6
| 566565 ||  || — || August 9, 2007 || Kitt Peak || Spacewatch ||  || align=right | 2.6 km || 
|-id=566 bgcolor=#E9E9E9
| 566566 ||  || — || November 26, 2014 || Haleakala || Pan-STARRS ||  || align=right | 2.1 km || 
|-id=567 bgcolor=#fefefe
| 566567 ||  || — || November 18, 2011 || Mount Lemmon || Mount Lemmon Survey ||  || align=right data-sort-value="0.65" | 650 m || 
|-id=568 bgcolor=#E9E9E9
| 566568 ||  || — || August 14, 2001 || Haleakala || AMOS ||  || align=right | 1.3 km || 
|-id=569 bgcolor=#E9E9E9
| 566569 ||  || — || December 30, 2005 || Kitt Peak || Spacewatch ||  || align=right | 2.8 km || 
|-id=570 bgcolor=#E9E9E9
| 566570 ||  || — || September 24, 2009 || Mount Lemmon || Mount Lemmon Survey ||  || align=right | 2.2 km || 
|-id=571 bgcolor=#E9E9E9
| 566571 ||  || — || August 20, 2004 || Kitt Peak || Spacewatch ||  || align=right | 1.7 km || 
|-id=572 bgcolor=#E9E9E9
| 566572 ||  || — || October 18, 2014 || Mount Lemmon || Mount Lemmon Survey ||  || align=right | 1.6 km || 
|-id=573 bgcolor=#fefefe
| 566573 ||  || — || May 26, 2011 || Mount Lemmon || Mount Lemmon Survey ||  || align=right data-sort-value="0.47" | 470 m || 
|-id=574 bgcolor=#E9E9E9
| 566574 ||  || — || September 17, 2004 || Kitt Peak || Spacewatch ||  || align=right | 2.4 km || 
|-id=575 bgcolor=#E9E9E9
| 566575 ||  || — || November 16, 2010 || Mount Lemmon || Mount Lemmon Survey ||  || align=right | 2.3 km || 
|-id=576 bgcolor=#d6d6d6
| 566576 ||  || — || June 20, 2013 || Haleakala || Pan-STARRS ||  || align=right | 2.3 km || 
|-id=577 bgcolor=#d6d6d6
| 566577 ||  || — || October 25, 2013 || Mount Lemmon || Mount Lemmon Survey ||  || align=right | 2.2 km || 
|-id=578 bgcolor=#d6d6d6
| 566578 ||  || — || October 16, 2013 || Mount Lemmon || Mount Lemmon Survey ||  || align=right | 2.5 km || 
|-id=579 bgcolor=#d6d6d6
| 566579 ||  || — || May 21, 2011 || Haleakala || Pan-STARRS ||  || align=right | 3.6 km || 
|-id=580 bgcolor=#fefefe
| 566580 ||  || — || December 16, 2011 || Mount Lemmon || Mount Lemmon Survey ||  || align=right data-sort-value="0.71" | 710 m || 
|-id=581 bgcolor=#fefefe
| 566581 ||  || — || September 15, 2007 || Anderson Mesa || LONEOS ||  || align=right data-sort-value="0.83" | 830 m || 
|-id=582 bgcolor=#E9E9E9
| 566582 ||  || — || July 27, 2014 || Haleakala || Pan-STARRS ||  || align=right | 1.5 km || 
|-id=583 bgcolor=#fefefe
| 566583 ||  || — || September 2, 2000 || Socorro || LINEAR ||  || align=right data-sort-value="0.97" | 970 m || 
|-id=584 bgcolor=#fefefe
| 566584 ||  || — || January 3, 2017 || Haleakala || Pan-STARRS ||  || align=right data-sort-value="0.85" | 850 m || 
|-id=585 bgcolor=#E9E9E9
| 566585 ||  || — || November 27, 2006 || Mount Lemmon || Mount Lemmon Survey ||  || align=right | 1.0 km || 
|-id=586 bgcolor=#E9E9E9
| 566586 ||  || — || November 10, 2005 || Catalina || CSS ||  || align=right | 1.6 km || 
|-id=587 bgcolor=#E9E9E9
| 566587 ||  || — || March 16, 2012 || Mount Lemmon || Mount Lemmon Survey ||  || align=right | 1.2 km || 
|-id=588 bgcolor=#E9E9E9
| 566588 ||  || — || April 10, 2013 || Kitt Peak || Spacewatch ||  || align=right | 1.5 km || 
|-id=589 bgcolor=#E9E9E9
| 566589 ||  || — || December 21, 2006 || Palomar || NEAT ||  || align=right | 1.2 km || 
|-id=590 bgcolor=#E9E9E9
| 566590 ||  || — || May 15, 2009 || Kitt Peak || Spacewatch ||  || align=right | 1.0 km || 
|-id=591 bgcolor=#d6d6d6
| 566591 ||  || — || October 30, 2008 || Mount Lemmon || Mount Lemmon Survey ||  || align=right | 3.0 km || 
|-id=592 bgcolor=#E9E9E9
| 566592 ||  || — || January 15, 2008 || Mount Lemmon || Mount Lemmon Survey ||  || align=right | 1.2 km || 
|-id=593 bgcolor=#fefefe
| 566593 ||  || — || September 12, 2007 || Catalina || CSS ||  || align=right | 1.0 km || 
|-id=594 bgcolor=#fefefe
| 566594 ||  || — || October 24, 2011 || Haleakala || Pan-STARRS ||  || align=right data-sort-value="0.91" | 910 m || 
|-id=595 bgcolor=#d6d6d6
| 566595 ||  || — || August 13, 2010 || Kitt Peak || Spacewatch || Tj (2.93) || align=right | 3.3 km || 
|-id=596 bgcolor=#E9E9E9
| 566596 ||  || — || February 7, 2011 || Mount Lemmon || Mount Lemmon Survey ||  || align=right | 2.1 km || 
|-id=597 bgcolor=#E9E9E9
| 566597 ||  || — || November 12, 2005 || Kitt Peak || Spacewatch ||  || align=right | 1.9 km || 
|-id=598 bgcolor=#E9E9E9
| 566598 ||  || — || January 28, 2007 || Mount Lemmon || Mount Lemmon Survey ||  || align=right | 1.5 km || 
|-id=599 bgcolor=#fefefe
| 566599 ||  || — || August 27, 2011 || Haleakala || Pan-STARRS ||  || align=right data-sort-value="0.57" | 570 m || 
|-id=600 bgcolor=#fefefe
| 566600 ||  || — || April 28, 2014 || Kitt Peak || Spacewatch ||  || align=right data-sort-value="0.67" | 670 m || 
|}

566601–566700 

|-bgcolor=#E9E9E9
| 566601 ||  || — || December 7, 2005 || Kitt Peak || Spacewatch ||  || align=right | 1.8 km || 
|-id=602 bgcolor=#E9E9E9
| 566602 ||  || — || December 16, 2006 || Mount Lemmon || Mount Lemmon Survey ||  || align=right | 1.5 km || 
|-id=603 bgcolor=#fefefe
| 566603 ||  || — || October 3, 2008 || La Sagra || OAM Obs. ||  || align=right data-sort-value="0.94" | 940 m || 
|-id=604 bgcolor=#E9E9E9
| 566604 ||  || — || October 26, 2005 || Kitt Peak || Spacewatch ||  || align=right | 2.1 km || 
|-id=605 bgcolor=#fefefe
| 566605 ||  || — || May 24, 2006 || Mount Lemmon || Mount Lemmon Survey ||  || align=right data-sort-value="0.83" | 830 m || 
|-id=606 bgcolor=#fefefe
| 566606 ||  || — || September 28, 2011 || ESA OGS || ESA OGS ||  || align=right data-sort-value="0.62" | 620 m || 
|-id=607 bgcolor=#E9E9E9
| 566607 ||  || — || January 1, 2012 || Kitt Peak || Mount Lemmon Survey ||  || align=right | 1.2 km || 
|-id=608 bgcolor=#E9E9E9
| 566608 ||  || — || October 16, 2009 || Catalina || CSS ||  || align=right | 2.2 km || 
|-id=609 bgcolor=#d6d6d6
| 566609 ||  || — || September 12, 2007 || Catalina || CSS ||  || align=right | 3.0 km || 
|-id=610 bgcolor=#d6d6d6
| 566610 ||  || — || October 10, 2007 || Mount Lemmon || Mount Lemmon Survey ||  || align=right | 2.7 km || 
|-id=611 bgcolor=#fefefe
| 566611 ||  || — || July 1, 2011 || Haleakala || Pan-STARRS ||  || align=right data-sort-value="0.85" | 850 m || 
|-id=612 bgcolor=#d6d6d6
| 566612 ||  || — || October 26, 2008 || Kitt Peak || Spacewatch ||  || align=right | 2.6 km || 
|-id=613 bgcolor=#d6d6d6
| 566613 ||  || — || October 3, 2013 || Mount Lemmon || Mount Lemmon Survey ||  || align=right | 2.8 km || 
|-id=614 bgcolor=#d6d6d6
| 566614 ||  || — || September 17, 2012 || Mount Lemmon || Mount Lemmon Survey ||  || align=right | 3.3 km || 
|-id=615 bgcolor=#d6d6d6
| 566615 ||  || — || October 14, 2013 || Mount Lemmon || Mount Lemmon Survey ||  || align=right | 2.5 km || 
|-id=616 bgcolor=#E9E9E9
| 566616 ||  || — || September 17, 2009 || Mount Lemmon || Mount Lemmon Survey ||  || align=right | 1.9 km || 
|-id=617 bgcolor=#E9E9E9
| 566617 ||  || — || May 6, 2016 || Haleakala || Pan-STARRS ||  || align=right | 3.2 km || 
|-id=618 bgcolor=#E9E9E9
| 566618 ||  || — || February 8, 2011 || Mount Lemmon || Mount Lemmon Survey ||  || align=right | 1.9 km || 
|-id=619 bgcolor=#d6d6d6
| 566619 ||  || — || April 5, 2005 || Mount Lemmon || Mount Lemmon Survey ||  || align=right | 3.5 km || 
|-id=620 bgcolor=#E9E9E9
| 566620 ||  || — || October 26, 2014 || Mount Lemmon || Mount Lemmon Survey ||  || align=right | 1.6 km || 
|-id=621 bgcolor=#d6d6d6
| 566621 ||  || — || January 30, 2011 || Kitt Peak || Spacewatch ||  || align=right | 3.3 km || 
|-id=622 bgcolor=#fefefe
| 566622 ||  || — || October 27, 2011 || Mount Lemmon || Mount Lemmon Survey ||  || align=right data-sort-value="0.96" | 960 m || 
|-id=623 bgcolor=#E9E9E9
| 566623 ||  || — || October 1, 2009 || Mount Lemmon || Mount Lemmon Survey ||  || align=right | 2.8 km || 
|-id=624 bgcolor=#E9E9E9
| 566624 ||  || — || February 11, 2016 || Haleakala || Pan-STARRS ||  || align=right | 2.3 km || 
|-id=625 bgcolor=#E9E9E9
| 566625 ||  || — || May 3, 2009 || Mount Lemmon || Mount Lemmon Survey ||  || align=right | 1.4 km || 
|-id=626 bgcolor=#E9E9E9
| 566626 ||  || — || October 2, 2014 || Haleakala || Pan-STARRS ||  || align=right | 1.5 km || 
|-id=627 bgcolor=#E9E9E9
| 566627 ||  || — || September 19, 2009 || Catalina || CSS ||  || align=right | 2.1 km || 
|-id=628 bgcolor=#d6d6d6
| 566628 ||  || — || March 18, 2009 || Kitt Peak || Spacewatch || Tj (2.96) || align=right | 4.2 km || 
|-id=629 bgcolor=#d6d6d6
| 566629 ||  || — || November 17, 2001 || Anderson Mesa || LONEOS ||  || align=right | 3.2 km || 
|-id=630 bgcolor=#d6d6d6
| 566630 ||  || — || November 8, 2008 || Mount Lemmon || Mount Lemmon Survey ||  || align=right | 3.3 km || 
|-id=631 bgcolor=#E9E9E9
| 566631 Svábhegy ||  ||  || November 1, 2010 || Piszkesteto || K. Sárneczky, Z. Kuli ||  || align=right | 1.8 km || 
|-id=632 bgcolor=#d6d6d6
| 566632 ||  || — || October 1, 2002 || Anderson Mesa || LONEOS ||  || align=right | 2.5 km || 
|-id=633 bgcolor=#d6d6d6
| 566633 ||  || — || October 8, 2002 || Palomar || NEAT ||  || align=right | 4.1 km || 
|-id=634 bgcolor=#d6d6d6
| 566634 ||  || — || February 2, 2009 || Kitt Peak || Spacewatch ||  || align=right | 2.4 km || 
|-id=635 bgcolor=#d6d6d6
| 566635 ||  || — || March 8, 2005 || Mount Lemmon || Mount Lemmon Survey ||  || align=right | 3.2 km || 
|-id=636 bgcolor=#E9E9E9
| 566636 ||  || — || August 5, 2005 || Palomar || NEAT ||  || align=right | 1.8 km || 
|-id=637 bgcolor=#E9E9E9
| 566637 ||  || — || January 28, 2007 || Kitt Peak || Spacewatch ||  || align=right | 1.6 km || 
|-id=638 bgcolor=#d6d6d6
| 566638 ||  || — || October 10, 2002 || Palomar || NEAT ||  || align=right | 3.4 km || 
|-id=639 bgcolor=#d6d6d6
| 566639 ||  || — || May 22, 2006 || Kitt Peak || Spacewatch ||  || align=right | 3.6 km || 
|-id=640 bgcolor=#E9E9E9
| 566640 ||  || — || September 2, 2014 || Haleakala || Pan-STARRS ||  || align=right data-sort-value="0.93" | 930 m || 
|-id=641 bgcolor=#E9E9E9
| 566641 ||  || — || February 6, 2007 || Palomar || NEAT ||  || align=right | 2.7 km || 
|-id=642 bgcolor=#d6d6d6
| 566642 ||  || — || January 18, 2015 || Mount Lemmon || Mount Lemmon Survey ||  || align=right | 3.0 km || 
|-id=643 bgcolor=#E9E9E9
| 566643 ||  || — || September 11, 2014 || Haleakala || Pan-STARRS ||  || align=right | 1.5 km || 
|-id=644 bgcolor=#E9E9E9
| 566644 ||  || — || August 6, 2014 || Haleakala || Pan-STARRS ||  || align=right data-sort-value="0.94" | 940 m || 
|-id=645 bgcolor=#d6d6d6
| 566645 ||  || — || November 28, 2003 || Apache Point || SDSS Collaboration ||  || align=right | 3.0 km || 
|-id=646 bgcolor=#d6d6d6
| 566646 ||  || — || December 4, 2008 || Mount Lemmon || Mount Lemmon Survey ||  || align=right | 3.9 km || 
|-id=647 bgcolor=#fefefe
| 566647 ||  || — || November 4, 2007 || Kitt Peak || Spacewatch ||  || align=right data-sort-value="0.77" | 770 m || 
|-id=648 bgcolor=#d6d6d6
| 566648 ||  || — || September 19, 2001 || Socorro || LINEAR ||  || align=right | 3.6 km || 
|-id=649 bgcolor=#E9E9E9
| 566649 ||  || — || March 6, 2008 || Mount Lemmon || Mount Lemmon Survey ||  || align=right data-sort-value="0.99" | 990 m || 
|-id=650 bgcolor=#d6d6d6
| 566650 ||  || — || June 16, 2006 || Kitt Peak || Spacewatch ||  || align=right | 2.8 km || 
|-id=651 bgcolor=#E9E9E9
| 566651 ||  || — || November 5, 2005 || Kitt Peak || Spacewatch ||  || align=right | 1.8 km || 
|-id=652 bgcolor=#E9E9E9
| 566652 ||  || — || November 29, 2005 || Kitt Peak || Spacewatch ||  || align=right | 2.5 km || 
|-id=653 bgcolor=#fefefe
| 566653 ||  || — || June 24, 2014 || Haleakala || Pan-STARRS ||  || align=right data-sort-value="0.81" | 810 m || 
|-id=654 bgcolor=#d6d6d6
| 566654 ||  || — || July 6, 2003 || Kitt Peak || Spacewatch ||  || align=right | 2.9 km || 
|-id=655 bgcolor=#E9E9E9
| 566655 ||  || — || September 17, 2009 || Catalina || CSS ||  || align=right | 2.7 km || 
|-id=656 bgcolor=#E9E9E9
| 566656 ||  || — || May 9, 2000 || Kitt Peak || Spacewatch ||  || align=right | 1.9 km || 
|-id=657 bgcolor=#d6d6d6
| 566657 ||  || — || February 2, 2009 || Mount Lemmon || Mount Lemmon Survey ||  || align=right | 3.9 km || 
|-id=658 bgcolor=#E9E9E9
| 566658 ||  || — || June 10, 2013 || Mount Lemmon || Mount Lemmon Survey ||  || align=right | 2.3 km || 
|-id=659 bgcolor=#E9E9E9
| 566659 ||  || — || August 20, 2009 || La Sagra || OAM Obs. ||  || align=right | 1.3 km || 
|-id=660 bgcolor=#E9E9E9
| 566660 ||  || — || January 30, 2011 || Kitt Peak || Mount Lemmon Survey ||  || align=right | 2.2 km || 
|-id=661 bgcolor=#d6d6d6
| 566661 ||  || — || December 22, 2008 || Kitt Peak || Spacewatch ||  || align=right | 2.8 km || 
|-id=662 bgcolor=#d6d6d6
| 566662 ||  || — || March 16, 2015 || Haleakala || Pan-STARRS ||  || align=right | 3.5 km || 
|-id=663 bgcolor=#E9E9E9
| 566663 ||  || — || June 30, 2014 || Haleakala || Pan-STARRS ||  || align=right | 2.2 km || 
|-id=664 bgcolor=#E9E9E9
| 566664 ||  || — || May 16, 2009 || Kitt Peak || Spacewatch ||  || align=right data-sort-value="0.81" | 810 m || 
|-id=665 bgcolor=#d6d6d6
| 566665 ||  || — || September 27, 2008 || Mount Lemmon || Mount Lemmon Survey ||  || align=right | 2.1 km || 
|-id=666 bgcolor=#d6d6d6
| 566666 ||  || — || September 28, 2003 || Kitt Peak || Spacewatch ||  || align=right | 2.7 km || 
|-id=667 bgcolor=#fefefe
| 566667 ||  || — || June 20, 2001 || Palomar || NEAT ||  || align=right data-sort-value="0.93" | 930 m || 
|-id=668 bgcolor=#E9E9E9
| 566668 ||  || — || April 29, 2008 || Mount Lemmon || Mount Lemmon Survey ||  || align=right | 1.8 km || 
|-id=669 bgcolor=#fefefe
| 566669 ||  || — || September 22, 2003 || Kitt Peak || Spacewatch ||  || align=right data-sort-value="0.70" | 700 m || 
|-id=670 bgcolor=#E9E9E9
| 566670 ||  || — || December 29, 2014 || Haleakala || Pan-STARRS ||  || align=right | 2.1 km || 
|-id=671 bgcolor=#E9E9E9
| 566671 ||  || — || September 20, 2009 || Mount Lemmon || Mount Lemmon Survey ||  || align=right | 1.8 km || 
|-id=672 bgcolor=#d6d6d6
| 566672 ||  || — || May 26, 2007 || Mount Lemmon || Mount Lemmon Survey ||  || align=right | 2.6 km || 
|-id=673 bgcolor=#E9E9E9
| 566673 ||  || — || October 8, 2010 || Kitt Peak || Spacewatch ||  || align=right data-sort-value="0.74" | 740 m || 
|-id=674 bgcolor=#d6d6d6
| 566674 ||  || — || October 10, 2002 || Mount Lemmon || NEAT ||  || align=right | 2.8 km || 
|-id=675 bgcolor=#E9E9E9
| 566675 ||  || — || April 14, 2007 || Mount Lemmon || Mount Lemmon Survey ||  || align=right | 2.1 km || 
|-id=676 bgcolor=#E9E9E9
| 566676 ||  || — || December 25, 2005 || Mount Lemmon || Mount Lemmon Survey ||  || align=right | 2.4 km || 
|-id=677 bgcolor=#d6d6d6
| 566677 ||  || — || April 6, 2011 || Mount Lemmon || Mount Lemmon Survey ||  || align=right | 2.7 km || 
|-id=678 bgcolor=#d6d6d6
| 566678 ||  || — || July 24, 2003 || Palomar || NEAT ||  || align=right | 2.7 km || 
|-id=679 bgcolor=#E9E9E9
| 566679 ||  || — || October 27, 2005 || Kitt Peak || Spacewatch ||  || align=right | 1.4 km || 
|-id=680 bgcolor=#E9E9E9
| 566680 ||  || — || September 16, 2009 || Kitt Peak || Spacewatch ||  || align=right | 2.1 km || 
|-id=681 bgcolor=#E9E9E9
| 566681 ||  || — || November 23, 2006 || Kitt Peak || Spacewatch ||  || align=right | 1.4 km || 
|-id=682 bgcolor=#fefefe
| 566682 ||  || — || October 6, 2004 || Kitt Peak || Spacewatch ||  || align=right data-sort-value="0.75" | 750 m || 
|-id=683 bgcolor=#E9E9E9
| 566683 ||  || — || September 9, 2004 || Socorro || LINEAR ||  || align=right | 2.6 km || 
|-id=684 bgcolor=#d6d6d6
| 566684 ||  || — || May 21, 2012 || Mount Lemmon || Mount Lemmon Survey ||  || align=right | 3.0 km || 
|-id=685 bgcolor=#E9E9E9
| 566685 ||  || — || September 20, 2009 || Kitt Peak || Spacewatch ||  || align=right | 1.6 km || 
|-id=686 bgcolor=#d6d6d6
| 566686 ||  || — || November 18, 2009 || Kitt Peak || Spacewatch ||  || align=right | 2.7 km || 
|-id=687 bgcolor=#d6d6d6
| 566687 ||  || — || January 1, 2009 || Kitt Peak || Spacewatch ||  || align=right | 2.7 km || 
|-id=688 bgcolor=#E9E9E9
| 566688 ||  || — || December 10, 2010 || Mount Lemmon || Mount Lemmon Survey ||  || align=right | 1.6 km || 
|-id=689 bgcolor=#E9E9E9
| 566689 ||  || — || August 31, 2014 || Catalina || CSS ||  || align=right | 1.9 km || 
|-id=690 bgcolor=#fefefe
| 566690 ||  || — || September 4, 2007 || Catalina || CSS ||  || align=right data-sort-value="0.72" | 720 m || 
|-id=691 bgcolor=#E9E9E9
| 566691 ||  || — || November 21, 2014 || Mount Lemmon || Mount Lemmon Survey ||  || align=right | 1.7 km || 
|-id=692 bgcolor=#E9E9E9
| 566692 ||  || — || March 23, 2004 || Kitt Peak || Spacewatch ||  || align=right | 1.9 km || 
|-id=693 bgcolor=#fefefe
| 566693 ||  || — || October 15, 2004 || Mount Lemmon || Mount Lemmon Survey ||  || align=right data-sort-value="0.67" | 670 m || 
|-id=694 bgcolor=#d6d6d6
| 566694 ||  || — || March 9, 2011 || Mount Lemmon || Mount Lemmon Survey ||  || align=right | 3.0 km || 
|-id=695 bgcolor=#d6d6d6
| 566695 ||  || — || September 15, 2006 || Kitt Peak || Spacewatch ||  || align=right | 2.0 km || 
|-id=696 bgcolor=#d6d6d6
| 566696 ||  || — || October 8, 2007 || Mount Lemmon || Mount Lemmon Survey ||  || align=right | 2.2 km || 
|-id=697 bgcolor=#E9E9E9
| 566697 ||  || — || October 26, 2005 || Kitt Peak || Spacewatch ||  || align=right | 1.1 km || 
|-id=698 bgcolor=#d6d6d6
| 566698 ||  || — || September 10, 2007 || Kitt Peak || Spacewatch ||  || align=right | 2.4 km || 
|-id=699 bgcolor=#E9E9E9
| 566699 ||  || — || November 6, 2005 || Kitt Peak || Spacewatch ||  || align=right | 1.3 km || 
|-id=700 bgcolor=#d6d6d6
| 566700 ||  || — || October 15, 2018 || Haleakala || Pan-STARRS 2 || 7:4 || align=right | 3.4 km || 
|}

566701–566800 

|-bgcolor=#d6d6d6
| 566701 ||  || — || October 4, 2018 || Haleakala || Pan-STARRS 2 ||  || align=right | 2.0 km || 
|-id=702 bgcolor=#E9E9E9
| 566702 ||  || — || October 15, 2018 || Siding Spring || Pan-STARRS 2 ||  || align=right | 2.4 km || 
|-id=703 bgcolor=#d6d6d6
| 566703 ||  || — || October 15, 2018 || Haleakala || Pan-STARRS 2 ||  || align=right | 2.0 km || 
|-id=704 bgcolor=#d6d6d6
| 566704 ||  || — || September 13, 2007 || Mount Lemmon || Mount Lemmon Survey ||  || align=right | 2.5 km || 
|-id=705 bgcolor=#d6d6d6
| 566705 ||  || — || June 24, 2017 || Haleakala || Pan-STARRS ||  || align=right | 2.0 km || 
|-id=706 bgcolor=#E9E9E9
| 566706 ||  || — || April 26, 2009 || Siding Spring || SSS ||  || align=right | 1.4 km || 
|-id=707 bgcolor=#E9E9E9
| 566707 ||  || — || August 31, 2005 || Kitt Peak || Spacewatch ||  || align=right | 1.2 km || 
|-id=708 bgcolor=#E9E9E9
| 566708 ||  || — || August 30, 2005 || Campo Imperatore || A. Boattini ||  || align=right | 1.8 km || 
|-id=709 bgcolor=#d6d6d6
| 566709 ||  || — || October 8, 2007 || Catalina || CSS ||  || align=right | 3.4 km || 
|-id=710 bgcolor=#d6d6d6
| 566710 ||  || — || May 31, 2011 || Mount Lemmon || Mount Lemmon Survey ||  || align=right | 3.1 km || 
|-id=711 bgcolor=#E9E9E9
| 566711 ||  || — || September 1, 2005 || Kitt Peak || Spacewatch ||  || align=right | 1.5 km || 
|-id=712 bgcolor=#d6d6d6
| 566712 ||  || — || September 13, 2007 || Palomar || CSS ||  || align=right | 3.5 km || 
|-id=713 bgcolor=#d6d6d6
| 566713 ||  || — || October 8, 2007 || Catalina || CSS ||  || align=right | 2.8 km || 
|-id=714 bgcolor=#E9E9E9
| 566714 ||  || — || July 24, 1995 || Kitt Peak || Spacewatch ||  || align=right | 2.5 km || 
|-id=715 bgcolor=#E9E9E9
| 566715 ||  || — || September 23, 2009 || Mount Lemmon || Mount Lemmon Survey ||  || align=right | 2.4 km || 
|-id=716 bgcolor=#E9E9E9
| 566716 ||  || — || November 8, 2009 || Kitt Peak || Spacewatch ||  || align=right | 2.1 km || 
|-id=717 bgcolor=#E9E9E9
| 566717 ||  || — || November 10, 1993 || Kitt Peak || Spacewatch ||  || align=right | 1.3 km || 
|-id=718 bgcolor=#d6d6d6
| 566718 ||  || — || October 20, 2001 || Socorro || LINEAR ||  || align=right | 3.2 km || 
|-id=719 bgcolor=#d6d6d6
| 566719 ||  || — || January 26, 2006 || Kitt Peak || Spacewatch ||  || align=right | 2.6 km || 
|-id=720 bgcolor=#fefefe
| 566720 ||  || — || January 14, 2008 || Kitt Peak || Spacewatch ||  || align=right data-sort-value="0.80" | 800 m || 
|-id=721 bgcolor=#d6d6d6
| 566721 ||  || — || August 22, 2003 || Palomar || NEAT ||  || align=right | 2.7 km || 
|-id=722 bgcolor=#E9E9E9
| 566722 ||  || — || April 9, 2016 || Haleakala || Pan-STARRS ||  || align=right | 1.4 km || 
|-id=723 bgcolor=#E9E9E9
| 566723 ||  || — || April 22, 2007 || Mount Lemmon || Mount Lemmon Survey ||  || align=right | 2.9 km || 
|-id=724 bgcolor=#E9E9E9
| 566724 ||  || — || October 23, 2004 || Pla D'Arguines || R. Ferrando ||  || align=right | 1.7 km || 
|-id=725 bgcolor=#d6d6d6
| 566725 ||  || — || April 28, 2011 || Mount Lemmon || Mount Lemmon Survey ||  || align=right | 2.5 km || 
|-id=726 bgcolor=#E9E9E9
| 566726 ||  || — || October 13, 2004 || Kitt Peak || Spacewatch ||  || align=right | 1.9 km || 
|-id=727 bgcolor=#d6d6d6
| 566727 ||  || — || October 17, 2001 || Kitt Peak || Spacewatch ||  || align=right | 2.7 km || 
|-id=728 bgcolor=#d6d6d6
| 566728 ||  || — || November 4, 2013 || Kitt Peak || Spacewatch ||  || align=right | 2.6 km || 
|-id=729 bgcolor=#d6d6d6
| 566729 ||  || — || September 27, 2008 || Mount Lemmon || Mount Lemmon Survey ||  || align=right | 2.5 km || 
|-id=730 bgcolor=#E9E9E9
| 566730 ||  || — || May 20, 2012 || Haleakala || Pan-STARRS ||  || align=right | 1.9 km || 
|-id=731 bgcolor=#d6d6d6
| 566731 ||  || — || December 6, 2008 || Kitt Peak || Spacewatch ||  || align=right | 2.8 km || 
|-id=732 bgcolor=#fefefe
| 566732 ||  || — || September 26, 2011 || Moletai || K. Černis, J. Zdanavičius ||  || align=right data-sort-value="0.80" | 800 m || 
|-id=733 bgcolor=#E9E9E9
| 566733 ||  || — || September 22, 2009 || Mount Lemmon || Mount Lemmon Survey ||  || align=right | 2.2 km || 
|-id=734 bgcolor=#d6d6d6
| 566734 ||  || — || November 9, 2013 || Mount Lemmon || Mount Lemmon Survey ||  || align=right | 2.7 km || 
|-id=735 bgcolor=#E9E9E9
| 566735 ||  || — || December 16, 2014 || Haleakala || Pan-STARRS ||  || align=right | 1.8 km || 
|-id=736 bgcolor=#d6d6d6
| 566736 ||  || — || December 31, 2013 || Mount Lemmon || Mount Lemmon Survey ||  || align=right | 2.7 km || 
|-id=737 bgcolor=#E9E9E9
| 566737 ||  || — || September 25, 2005 || Kitt Peak || Spacewatch ||  || align=right | 1.3 km || 
|-id=738 bgcolor=#d6d6d6
| 566738 ||  || — || March 6, 2011 || Kitt Peak || Spacewatch ||  || align=right | 2.7 km || 
|-id=739 bgcolor=#E9E9E9
| 566739 ||  || — || October 6, 2005 || Anderson Mesa || LONEOS ||  || align=right | 1.3 km || 
|-id=740 bgcolor=#E9E9E9
| 566740 ||  || — || August 27, 2013 || Haleakala || Pan-STARRS ||  || align=right | 2.4 km || 
|-id=741 bgcolor=#d6d6d6
| 566741 ||  || — || November 20, 2007 || Kitt Peak || Spacewatch ||  || align=right | 4.0 km || 
|-id=742 bgcolor=#d6d6d6
| 566742 ||  || — || November 26, 2013 || Haleakala || Pan-STARRS ||  || align=right | 3.0 km || 
|-id=743 bgcolor=#d6d6d6
| 566743 ||  || — || October 10, 2007 || Kitt Peak || Spacewatch ||  || align=right | 3.3 km || 
|-id=744 bgcolor=#d6d6d6
| 566744 ||  || — || October 12, 2007 || Mount Lemmon || Mount Lemmon Survey ||  || align=right | 2.6 km || 
|-id=745 bgcolor=#E9E9E9
| 566745 ||  || — || January 7, 2006 || Kitt Peak || Spacewatch ||  || align=right | 1.8 km || 
|-id=746 bgcolor=#E9E9E9
| 566746 ||  || — || July 15, 2017 || Haleakala || Pan-STARRS ||  || align=right | 2.3 km || 
|-id=747 bgcolor=#E9E9E9
| 566747 ||  || — || July 14, 2013 || Haleakala || Pan-STARRS ||  || align=right | 1.9 km || 
|-id=748 bgcolor=#E9E9E9
| 566748 ||  || — || March 10, 2007 || Kitt Peak || Spacewatch ||  || align=right | 2.3 km || 
|-id=749 bgcolor=#d6d6d6
| 566749 ||  || — || December 3, 2004 || Kitt Peak || Spacewatch ||  || align=right | 2.6 km || 
|-id=750 bgcolor=#d6d6d6
| 566750 ||  || — || November 28, 2013 || Mount Lemmon || Mount Lemmon Survey ||  || align=right | 2.7 km || 
|-id=751 bgcolor=#E9E9E9
| 566751 ||  || — || November 18, 2009 || Kitt Peak || Spacewatch ||  || align=right | 1.8 km || 
|-id=752 bgcolor=#d6d6d6
| 566752 ||  || — || October 6, 2018 || Mount Lemmon || Mount Lemmon Survey ||  || align=right | 2.4 km || 
|-id=753 bgcolor=#E9E9E9
| 566753 ||  || — || February 7, 2002 || Kitt Peak || Spacewatch ||  || align=right | 2.0 km || 
|-id=754 bgcolor=#E9E9E9
| 566754 ||  || — || October 25, 2014 || Mount Lemmon || Mount Lemmon Survey ||  || align=right | 1.3 km || 
|-id=755 bgcolor=#E9E9E9
| 566755 ||  || — || July 5, 2000 || Kitt Peak || Spacewatch ||  || align=right | 1.8 km || 
|-id=756 bgcolor=#E9E9E9
| 566756 ||  || — || December 9, 2010 || Mount Lemmon || Mount Lemmon Survey ||  || align=right | 1.4 km || 
|-id=757 bgcolor=#E9E9E9
| 566757 ||  || — || August 14, 2013 || Haleakala || Pan-STARRS ||  || align=right | 1.7 km || 
|-id=758 bgcolor=#d6d6d6
| 566758 ||  || — || October 9, 2013 || Mount Lemmon || Mount Lemmon Survey ||  || align=right | 2.7 km || 
|-id=759 bgcolor=#E9E9E9
| 566759 ||  || — || December 27, 2006 || Mount Lemmon || Mount Lemmon Survey ||  || align=right data-sort-value="0.82" | 820 m || 
|-id=760 bgcolor=#d6d6d6
| 566760 ||  || — || February 18, 2004 || Kitt Peak || Spacewatch ||  || align=right | 3.5 km || 
|-id=761 bgcolor=#E9E9E9
| 566761 ||  || — || October 26, 2009 || Kitt Peak || Spacewatch ||  || align=right | 1.7 km || 
|-id=762 bgcolor=#d6d6d6
| 566762 ||  || — || October 16, 2018 || Haleakala || Pan-STARRS 2 ||  || align=right | 1.8 km || 
|-id=763 bgcolor=#d6d6d6
| 566763 ||  || — || October 14, 2007 || Mount Lemmon || Mount Lemmon Survey ||  || align=right | 2.1 km || 
|-id=764 bgcolor=#d6d6d6
| 566764 ||  || — || September 10, 2007 || Kitt Peak || Spacewatch ||  || align=right | 2.2 km || 
|-id=765 bgcolor=#d6d6d6
| 566765 ||  || — || October 5, 2013 || Kitt Peak || Spacewatch ||  || align=right | 2.6 km || 
|-id=766 bgcolor=#d6d6d6
| 566766 ||  || — || February 3, 2009 || Kitt Peak || Spacewatch ||  || align=right | 2.2 km || 
|-id=767 bgcolor=#E9E9E9
| 566767 ||  || — || November 8, 2009 || Mount Lemmon || Mount Lemmon Survey ||  || align=right | 1.8 km || 
|-id=768 bgcolor=#d6d6d6
| 566768 ||  || — || April 9, 2010 || Kitt Peak || Spacewatch ||  || align=right | 2.9 km || 
|-id=769 bgcolor=#fefefe
| 566769 ||  || — || September 30, 2011 || Kitt Peak || Spacewatch ||  || align=right data-sort-value="0.79" | 790 m || 
|-id=770 bgcolor=#E9E9E9
| 566770 ||  || — || October 14, 2009 || Mount Lemmon || Mount Lemmon Survey ||  || align=right | 2.1 km || 
|-id=771 bgcolor=#E9E9E9
| 566771 ||  || — || December 2, 2005 || Kitt Peak || Spacewatch ||  || align=right | 2.1 km || 
|-id=772 bgcolor=#d6d6d6
| 566772 ||  || — || October 10, 2007 || Mount Lemmon || Mount Lemmon Survey ||  || align=right | 3.0 km || 
|-id=773 bgcolor=#E9E9E9
| 566773 ||  || — || February 13, 2002 || Apache Point || SDSS Collaboration ||  || align=right | 1.8 km || 
|-id=774 bgcolor=#d6d6d6
| 566774 ||  || — || September 20, 2007 || Kitt Peak || Spacewatch ||  || align=right | 2.8 km || 
|-id=775 bgcolor=#E9E9E9
| 566775 ||  || — || September 25, 2005 || Kitt Peak || Spacewatch ||  || align=right | 1.4 km || 
|-id=776 bgcolor=#E9E9E9
| 566776 ||  || — || March 31, 2008 || Mount Lemmon || Mount Lemmon Survey ||  || align=right | 1.5 km || 
|-id=777 bgcolor=#E9E9E9
| 566777 ||  || — || May 17, 2009 || Mount Lemmon || Mount Lemmon Survey ||  || align=right data-sort-value="0.77" | 770 m || 
|-id=778 bgcolor=#d6d6d6
| 566778 ||  || — || March 23, 2004 || Kitt Peak || Spacewatch ||  || align=right | 2.8 km || 
|-id=779 bgcolor=#d6d6d6
| 566779 ||  || — || May 31, 2011 || Mount Lemmon || Mount Lemmon Survey ||  || align=right | 3.1 km || 
|-id=780 bgcolor=#d6d6d6
| 566780 ||  || — || November 30, 2008 || Kitt Peak || Spacewatch ||  || align=right | 3.1 km || 
|-id=781 bgcolor=#d6d6d6
| 566781 ||  || — || January 2, 2009 || Kitt Peak || Spacewatch ||  || align=right | 2.7 km || 
|-id=782 bgcolor=#fefefe
| 566782 ||  || — || November 13, 2015 || Mount Lemmon || Mount Lemmon Survey ||  || align=right data-sort-value="0.71" | 710 m || 
|-id=783 bgcolor=#d6d6d6
| 566783 ||  || — || May 1, 2011 || Kitt Peak || Pan-STARRS ||  || align=right | 2.8 km || 
|-id=784 bgcolor=#E9E9E9
| 566784 ||  || — || August 18, 2009 || Kitt Peak || Spacewatch ||  || align=right | 1.4 km || 
|-id=785 bgcolor=#d6d6d6
| 566785 ||  || — || May 1, 2011 || Kitt Peak || Pan-STARRS ||  || align=right | 2.7 km || 
|-id=786 bgcolor=#E9E9E9
| 566786 ||  || — || June 9, 2013 || Mount Lemmon || Mount Lemmon Survey ||  || align=right | 1.9 km || 
|-id=787 bgcolor=#d6d6d6
| 566787 ||  || — || January 17, 2015 || Haleakala || Pan-STARRS ||  || align=right | 2.9 km || 
|-id=788 bgcolor=#d6d6d6
| 566788 ||  || — || September 18, 2007 || Kitt Peak || Spacewatch ||  || align=right | 3.6 km || 
|-id=789 bgcolor=#d6d6d6
| 566789 ||  || — || December 29, 2013 || Haleakala || Pan-STARRS ||  || align=right | 2.5 km || 
|-id=790 bgcolor=#E9E9E9
| 566790 ||  || — || January 11, 2011 || Mount Lemmon || Mount Lemmon Survey ||  || align=right | 1.4 km || 
|-id=791 bgcolor=#fefefe
| 566791 ||  || — || November 4, 2005 || Mount Lemmon || Mount Lemmon Survey ||  || align=right data-sort-value="0.69" | 690 m || 
|-id=792 bgcolor=#E9E9E9
| 566792 ||  || — || December 12, 2014 || Haleakala || Pan-STARRS ||  || align=right | 1.2 km || 
|-id=793 bgcolor=#d6d6d6
| 566793 ||  || — || November 1, 2007 || Kitt Peak || Spacewatch ||  || align=right | 3.0 km || 
|-id=794 bgcolor=#d6d6d6
| 566794 ||  || — || October 24, 2013 || Mount Lemmon || Mount Lemmon Survey ||  || align=right | 1.9 km || 
|-id=795 bgcolor=#d6d6d6
| 566795 ||  || — || December 11, 2013 || Haleakala || Pan-STARRS ||  || align=right | 2.6 km || 
|-id=796 bgcolor=#E9E9E9
| 566796 ||  || — || April 26, 2017 || Haleakala || Pan-STARRS ||  || align=right | 2.8 km || 
|-id=797 bgcolor=#d6d6d6
| 566797 ||  || — || September 5, 2007 || Mount Lemmon || Mount Lemmon Survey ||  || align=right | 2.7 km || 
|-id=798 bgcolor=#fefefe
| 566798 ||  || — || December 27, 2011 || Kitt Peak || Spacewatch ||  || align=right data-sort-value="0.81" | 810 m || 
|-id=799 bgcolor=#E9E9E9
| 566799 ||  || — || September 26, 2009 || Kitt Peak || Spacewatch ||  || align=right | 2.4 km || 
|-id=800 bgcolor=#d6d6d6
| 566800 ||  || — || November 5, 2007 || Kitt Peak || Spacewatch ||  || align=right | 3.1 km || 
|}

566801–566900 

|-bgcolor=#E9E9E9
| 566801 ||  || — || November 4, 2014 || Mount Lemmon || Mount Lemmon Survey ||  || align=right data-sort-value="0.91" | 910 m || 
|-id=802 bgcolor=#d6d6d6
| 566802 ||  || — || March 14, 2010 || Mount Lemmon || Mount Lemmon Survey ||  || align=right | 2.6 km || 
|-id=803 bgcolor=#E9E9E9
| 566803 ||  || — || November 3, 2014 || Mount Lemmon || Mount Lemmon Survey ||  || align=right | 1.8 km || 
|-id=804 bgcolor=#d6d6d6
| 566804 ||  || — || October 7, 2007 || Mount Lemmon || Mount Lemmon Survey ||  || align=right | 3.0 km || 
|-id=805 bgcolor=#E9E9E9
| 566805 ||  || — || April 20, 2012 || Siding Spring || SSS ||  || align=right | 1.5 km || 
|-id=806 bgcolor=#d6d6d6
| 566806 ||  || — || October 8, 2007 || Mount Lemmon || Mount Lemmon Survey ||  || align=right | 2.7 km || 
|-id=807 bgcolor=#d6d6d6
| 566807 ||  || — || August 16, 2006 || Lulin || LUSS ||  || align=right | 2.8 km || 
|-id=808 bgcolor=#d6d6d6
| 566808 ||  || — || September 12, 2007 || Mount Lemmon || Mount Lemmon Survey ||  || align=right | 2.5 km || 
|-id=809 bgcolor=#E9E9E9
| 566809 ||  || — || October 10, 2004 || Kitt Peak || Spacewatch ||  || align=right | 1.9 km || 
|-id=810 bgcolor=#E9E9E9
| 566810 ||  || — || December 25, 2005 || Kitt Peak || Spacewatch ||  || align=right | 1.9 km || 
|-id=811 bgcolor=#d6d6d6
| 566811 ||  || — || December 14, 2013 || Mount Lemmon || Mount Lemmon Survey ||  || align=right | 2.7 km || 
|-id=812 bgcolor=#E9E9E9
| 566812 ||  || — || October 8, 2005 || Catalina || CSS ||  || align=right | 1.9 km || 
|-id=813 bgcolor=#E9E9E9
| 566813 ||  || — || April 16, 2013 || Haleakala || Pan-STARRS ||  || align=right | 1.5 km || 
|-id=814 bgcolor=#d6d6d6
| 566814 ||  || — || October 17, 2007 || Catalina || CSS ||  || align=right | 2.8 km || 
|-id=815 bgcolor=#d6d6d6
| 566815 ||  || — || March 15, 2004 || Kitt Peak || Spacewatch ||  || align=right | 3.2 km || 
|-id=816 bgcolor=#d6d6d6
| 566816 ||  || — || October 15, 2018 || Haleakala || Pan-STARRS 2 ||  || align=right | 2.6 km || 
|-id=817 bgcolor=#d6d6d6
| 566817 ||  || — || December 6, 2013 || Haleakala || Pan-STARRS ||  || align=right | 2.7 km || 
|-id=818 bgcolor=#d6d6d6
| 566818 ||  || — || October 24, 2007 || Mount Lemmon || Mount Lemmon Survey ||  || align=right | 2.9 km || 
|-id=819 bgcolor=#d6d6d6
| 566819 ||  || — || October 31, 2013 || Kitt Peak || Spacewatch ||  || align=right | 2.7 km || 
|-id=820 bgcolor=#E9E9E9
| 566820 ||  || — || October 8, 2004 || Kitt Peak || Spacewatch ||  || align=right | 2.4 km || 
|-id=821 bgcolor=#d6d6d6
| 566821 ||  || — || August 8, 2012 || Haleakala || Pan-STARRS ||  || align=right | 2.4 km || 
|-id=822 bgcolor=#E9E9E9
| 566822 ||  || — || December 15, 2001 || Socorro || LINEAR ||  || align=right | 2.2 km || 
|-id=823 bgcolor=#E9E9E9
| 566823 ||  || — || July 30, 2005 || Palomar || NEAT ||  || align=right | 1.4 km || 
|-id=824 bgcolor=#E9E9E9
| 566824 ||  || — || August 18, 2009 || Catalina || CSS ||  || align=right | 2.1 km || 
|-id=825 bgcolor=#d6d6d6
| 566825 ||  || — || June 25, 2017 || Haleakala || Pan-STARRS ||  || align=right | 2.2 km || 
|-id=826 bgcolor=#d6d6d6
| 566826 ||  || — || November 27, 2013 || Haleakala || Pan-STARRS ||  || align=right | 3.3 km || 
|-id=827 bgcolor=#d6d6d6
| 566827 ||  || — || December 31, 2008 || Kitt Peak || Spacewatch ||  || align=right | 2.2 km || 
|-id=828 bgcolor=#E9E9E9
| 566828 ||  || — || September 17, 2004 || Anderson Mesa || LONEOS ||  || align=right | 2.4 km || 
|-id=829 bgcolor=#d6d6d6
| 566829 ||  || — || January 31, 2009 || Mount Lemmon || Mount Lemmon Survey ||  || align=right | 3.3 km || 
|-id=830 bgcolor=#d6d6d6
| 566830 ||  || — || April 7, 2011 || Kitt Peak || Spacewatch ||  || align=right | 2.0 km || 
|-id=831 bgcolor=#d6d6d6
| 566831 ||  || — || November 8, 2013 || Kitt Peak || Spacewatch ||  || align=right | 2.8 km || 
|-id=832 bgcolor=#d6d6d6
| 566832 ||  || — || January 3, 2009 || Mount Lemmon || Mount Lemmon Survey ||  || align=right | 2.9 km || 
|-id=833 bgcolor=#fefefe
| 566833 ||  || — || October 16, 2003 || Anderson Mesa || LONEOS ||  || align=right data-sort-value="0.90" | 900 m || 
|-id=834 bgcolor=#d6d6d6
| 566834 ||  || — || October 10, 2007 || Kitt Peak || Spacewatch ||  || align=right | 3.5 km || 
|-id=835 bgcolor=#E9E9E9
| 566835 ||  || — || January 19, 2008 || Mount Lemmon || Mount Lemmon Survey ||  || align=right | 1.6 km || 
|-id=836 bgcolor=#d6d6d6
| 566836 ||  || — || August 26, 2012 || Haleakala || Pan-STARRS ||  || align=right | 2.0 km || 
|-id=837 bgcolor=#d6d6d6
| 566837 ||  || — || September 22, 2012 || Kitt Peak || Spacewatch ||  || align=right | 2.4 km || 
|-id=838 bgcolor=#d6d6d6
| 566838 ||  || — || October 18, 2001 || Kitt Peak || Spacewatch ||  || align=right | 2.2 km || 
|-id=839 bgcolor=#d6d6d6
| 566839 ||  || — || October 30, 2007 || Mount Lemmon || Mount Lemmon Survey ||  || align=right | 1.9 km || 
|-id=840 bgcolor=#d6d6d6
| 566840 ||  || — || September 19, 2001 || Kitt Peak || Spacewatch ||  || align=right | 2.8 km || 
|-id=841 bgcolor=#d6d6d6
| 566841 ||  || — || October 9, 2012 || Mount Lemmon || Mount Lemmon Survey ||  || align=right | 2.1 km || 
|-id=842 bgcolor=#d6d6d6
| 566842 ||  || — || January 1, 2014 || Mount Lemmon || Mount Lemmon Survey ||  || align=right | 2.7 km || 
|-id=843 bgcolor=#d6d6d6
| 566843 ||  || — || April 10, 2005 || Mount Lemmon || Mount Lemmon Survey ||  || align=right | 2.6 km || 
|-id=844 bgcolor=#d6d6d6
| 566844 ||  || — || July 18, 2013 || Haleakala || Pan-STARRS ||  || align=right | 2.5 km || 
|-id=845 bgcolor=#d6d6d6
| 566845 ||  || — || February 16, 2015 || Haleakala || Pan-STARRS ||  || align=right | 2.2 km || 
|-id=846 bgcolor=#d6d6d6
| 566846 ||  || — || February 18, 2010 || Kitt Peak || Spacewatch ||  || align=right | 2.5 km || 
|-id=847 bgcolor=#d6d6d6
| 566847 ||  || — || October 24, 2013 || Kitt Peak || Spacewatch ||  || align=right | 2.4 km || 
|-id=848 bgcolor=#d6d6d6
| 566848 ||  || — || November 26, 2013 || Mount Lemmon || Mount Lemmon Survey ||  || align=right | 2.4 km || 
|-id=849 bgcolor=#d6d6d6
| 566849 ||  || — || March 13, 2010 || Mount Lemmon || Mount Lemmon Survey ||  || align=right | 3.2 km || 
|-id=850 bgcolor=#d6d6d6
| 566850 ||  || — || March 20, 2015 || Haleakala || Pan-STARRS ||  || align=right | 2.3 km || 
|-id=851 bgcolor=#d6d6d6
| 566851 ||  || — || March 17, 2004 || Kitt Peak || Spacewatch ||  || align=right | 2.4 km || 
|-id=852 bgcolor=#d6d6d6
| 566852 ||  || — || October 4, 2006 || Mount Lemmon || Mount Lemmon Survey || 7:4 || align=right | 2.7 km || 
|-id=853 bgcolor=#d6d6d6
| 566853 ||  || — || December 22, 2008 || Kitt Peak || Spacewatch ||  || align=right | 2.0 km || 
|-id=854 bgcolor=#d6d6d6
| 566854 ||  || — || November 10, 2013 || Kitt Peak || Spacewatch ||  || align=right | 2.0 km || 
|-id=855 bgcolor=#E9E9E9
| 566855 ||  || — || October 24, 2009 || Catalina || CSS ||  || align=right | 1.5 km || 
|-id=856 bgcolor=#d6d6d6
| 566856 ||  || — || September 19, 2011 || Haleakala || Pan-STARRS || 7:4 || align=right | 3.4 km || 
|-id=857 bgcolor=#E9E9E9
| 566857 ||  || — || September 13, 2013 || Mount Lemmon || Mount Lemmon Survey ||  || align=right | 2.1 km || 
|-id=858 bgcolor=#d6d6d6
| 566858 ||  || — || September 14, 2007 || Mount Lemmon || Mount Lemmon Survey ||  || align=right | 2.2 km || 
|-id=859 bgcolor=#d6d6d6
| 566859 ||  || — || November 1, 2013 || Kitt Peak || Spacewatch ||  || align=right | 2.2 km || 
|-id=860 bgcolor=#E9E9E9
| 566860 ||  || — || March 27, 2012 || Haleakala || Pan-STARRS ||  || align=right | 3.0 km || 
|-id=861 bgcolor=#d6d6d6
| 566861 ||  || — || November 12, 2007 || Mount Lemmon || Mount Lemmon Survey ||  || align=right | 2.2 km || 
|-id=862 bgcolor=#E9E9E9
| 566862 ||  || — || April 9, 2013 || Haleakala || Pan-STARRS ||  || align=right | 1.2 km || 
|-id=863 bgcolor=#d6d6d6
| 566863 ||  || — || December 31, 2002 || Socorro || LINEAR ||  || align=right | 3.4 km || 
|-id=864 bgcolor=#d6d6d6
| 566864 ||  || — || October 17, 2012 || Mount Lemmon || Mount Lemmon Survey ||  || align=right | 3.0 km || 
|-id=865 bgcolor=#d6d6d6
| 566865 ||  || — || October 16, 2007 || Mount Lemmon || Mount Lemmon Survey ||  || align=right | 4.5 km || 
|-id=866 bgcolor=#d6d6d6
| 566866 ||  || — || June 25, 2017 || Haleakala || Pan-STARRS ||  || align=right | 2.4 km || 
|-id=867 bgcolor=#fefefe
| 566867 ||  || — || January 2, 2012 || Mount Lemmon || Mount Lemmon Survey ||  || align=right | 1.1 km || 
|-id=868 bgcolor=#d6d6d6
| 566868 ||  || — || December 4, 2008 || Kitt Peak || Spacewatch ||  || align=right | 3.2 km || 
|-id=869 bgcolor=#d6d6d6
| 566869 ||  || — || November 17, 2007 || Kitt Peak || Spacewatch ||  || align=right | 2.9 km || 
|-id=870 bgcolor=#E9E9E9
| 566870 ||  || — || September 9, 2008 || Mount Lemmon || Mount Lemmon Survey ||  || align=right | 2.0 km || 
|-id=871 bgcolor=#d6d6d6
| 566871 ||  || — || October 8, 2012 || Haleakala || Pan-STARRS ||  || align=right | 2.5 km || 
|-id=872 bgcolor=#E9E9E9
| 566872 ||  || — || November 10, 2009 || Mount Lemmon || Mount Lemmon Survey ||  || align=right | 1.7 km || 
|-id=873 bgcolor=#d6d6d6
| 566873 ||  || — || September 23, 2012 || Mayhill-ISON || L. Elenin ||  || align=right | 2.5 km || 
|-id=874 bgcolor=#d6d6d6
| 566874 ||  || — || September 6, 2012 || Mount Lemmon || Mount Lemmon Survey ||  || align=right | 2.6 km || 
|-id=875 bgcolor=#d6d6d6
| 566875 ||  || — || November 27, 2013 || Haleakala || Pan-STARRS ||  || align=right | 2.5 km || 
|-id=876 bgcolor=#d6d6d6
| 566876 ||  || — || October 9, 2007 || Kitt Peak || Spacewatch ||  || align=right | 2.8 km || 
|-id=877 bgcolor=#E9E9E9
| 566877 ||  || — || January 21, 2015 || Catalina || CSS ||  || align=right | 2.0 km || 
|-id=878 bgcolor=#E9E9E9
| 566878 ||  || — || September 6, 2013 || Kitt Peak || Spacewatch ||  || align=right | 1.9 km || 
|-id=879 bgcolor=#E9E9E9
| 566879 ||  || — || November 10, 2010 || Kitt Peak || Spacewatch ||  || align=right | 1.0 km || 
|-id=880 bgcolor=#d6d6d6
| 566880 ||  || — || December 9, 2004 || Kitt Peak || Spacewatch ||  || align=right | 2.0 km || 
|-id=881 bgcolor=#E9E9E9
| 566881 ||  || — || September 30, 2009 || Mount Lemmon || Mount Lemmon Survey ||  || align=right | 1.9 km || 
|-id=882 bgcolor=#d6d6d6
| 566882 ||  || — || May 7, 2010 || Mount Lemmon || Mount Lemmon Survey ||  || align=right | 3.4 km || 
|-id=883 bgcolor=#d6d6d6
| 566883 ||  || — || September 15, 2007 || Mount Lemmon || Mount Lemmon Survey ||  || align=right | 3.0 km || 
|-id=884 bgcolor=#d6d6d6
| 566884 ||  || — || October 20, 2007 || Kitt Peak || Spacewatch ||  || align=right | 3.1 km || 
|-id=885 bgcolor=#d6d6d6
| 566885 ||  || — || October 22, 2008 || Kitt Peak || Spacewatch ||  || align=right | 1.9 km || 
|-id=886 bgcolor=#d6d6d6
| 566886 ||  || — || October 20, 2008 || Mount Lemmon || Mount Lemmon Survey ||  || align=right | 1.9 km || 
|-id=887 bgcolor=#d6d6d6
| 566887 ||  || — || October 8, 2012 || Haleakala || Pan-STARRS ||  || align=right | 2.2 km || 
|-id=888 bgcolor=#d6d6d6
| 566888 ||  || — || September 26, 2012 || Mount Lemmon || Mount Lemmon Survey ||  || align=right | 3.0 km || 
|-id=889 bgcolor=#d6d6d6
| 566889 ||  || — || October 10, 2008 || Mount Lemmon || Mount Lemmon Survey ||  || align=right | 2.2 km || 
|-id=890 bgcolor=#d6d6d6
| 566890 ||  || — || July 18, 2013 || Haleakala || Pan-STARRS ||  || align=right | 2.9 km || 
|-id=891 bgcolor=#E9E9E9
| 566891 ||  || — || February 1, 2016 || Haleakala || Pan-STARRS ||  || align=right data-sort-value="0.95" | 950 m || 
|-id=892 bgcolor=#d6d6d6
| 566892 ||  || — || September 13, 2013 || Kitt Peak || Spacewatch ||  || align=right | 1.8 km || 
|-id=893 bgcolor=#d6d6d6
| 566893 ||  || — || March 15, 2004 || Socorro || LINEAR ||  || align=right | 3.7 km || 
|-id=894 bgcolor=#d6d6d6
| 566894 ||  || — || December 27, 2013 || Oukaimeden || C. Rinner ||  || align=right | 2.5 km || 
|-id=895 bgcolor=#d6d6d6
| 566895 ||  || — || November 2, 2013 || Mount Lemmon || Mount Lemmon Survey ||  || align=right | 2.6 km || 
|-id=896 bgcolor=#E9E9E9
| 566896 ||  || — || October 2, 2013 || Haleakala || Pan-STARRS ||  || align=right | 2.1 km || 
|-id=897 bgcolor=#d6d6d6
| 566897 ||  || — || October 15, 2002 || Palomar || NEAT ||  || align=right | 2.7 km || 
|-id=898 bgcolor=#d6d6d6
| 566898 ||  || — || November 10, 2013 || Mount Lemmon || Mount Lemmon Survey ||  || align=right | 2.3 km || 
|-id=899 bgcolor=#E9E9E9
| 566899 ||  || — || October 24, 2009 || Catalina || CSS ||  || align=right | 2.3 km || 
|-id=900 bgcolor=#d6d6d6
| 566900 ||  || — || November 15, 2007 || Mount Lemmon || Mount Lemmon Survey ||  || align=right | 3.0 km || 
|}

566901–567000 

|-bgcolor=#E9E9E9
| 566901 ||  || — || October 23, 2006 || Mount Lemmon || Mount Lemmon Survey ||  || align=right data-sort-value="0.91" | 910 m || 
|-id=902 bgcolor=#d6d6d6
| 566902 ||  || — || October 23, 2001 || Palomar || NEAT ||  || align=right | 2.9 km || 
|-id=903 bgcolor=#d6d6d6
| 566903 ||  || — || June 21, 2017 || Haleakala || Pan-STARRS ||  || align=right | 2.3 km || 
|-id=904 bgcolor=#d6d6d6
| 566904 ||  || — || August 26, 2012 || Haleakala || Pan-STARRS ||  || align=right | 2.1 km || 
|-id=905 bgcolor=#d6d6d6
| 566905 ||  || — || December 30, 2008 || Kitt Peak || Spacewatch ||  || align=right | 2.8 km || 
|-id=906 bgcolor=#fefefe
| 566906 ||  || — || January 3, 2009 || Kitt Peak || Spacewatch ||  || align=right data-sort-value="0.78" | 780 m || 
|-id=907 bgcolor=#d6d6d6
| 566907 ||  || — || August 23, 2008 || Siding Spring || SSS ||  || align=right | 2.7 km || 
|-id=908 bgcolor=#d6d6d6
| 566908 ||  || — || December 3, 2007 || Goodricke-Pigott || R. A. Tucker ||  || align=right | 3.9 km || 
|-id=909 bgcolor=#d6d6d6
| 566909 ||  || — || December 12, 2004 || Kitt Peak || Spacewatch ||  || align=right | 3.3 km || 
|-id=910 bgcolor=#d6d6d6
| 566910 ||  || — || October 9, 2013 || Mayhill-ISON || L. Elenin ||  || align=right | 2.3 km || 
|-id=911 bgcolor=#d6d6d6
| 566911 ||  || — || February 17, 2015 || Haleakala || Pan-STARRS ||  || align=right | 2.8 km || 
|-id=912 bgcolor=#d6d6d6
| 566912 ||  || — || April 15, 2016 || Haleakala || Pan-STARRS ||  || align=right | 2.8 km || 
|-id=913 bgcolor=#d6d6d6
| 566913 ||  || — || November 8, 2007 || Kitt Peak || Spacewatch ||  || align=right | 3.2 km || 
|-id=914 bgcolor=#d6d6d6
| 566914 ||  || — || August 25, 2006 || Socorro || LINEAR ||  || align=right | 4.1 km || 
|-id=915 bgcolor=#d6d6d6
| 566915 ||  || — || November 27, 2013 || Haleakala || Pan-STARRS ||  || align=right | 2.9 km || 
|-id=916 bgcolor=#d6d6d6
| 566916 ||  || — || December 22, 2003 || Kitt Peak || Spacewatch ||  || align=right | 2.1 km || 
|-id=917 bgcolor=#d6d6d6
| 566917 ||  || — || January 23, 2015 || Haleakala || Pan-STARRS ||  || align=right | 2.5 km || 
|-id=918 bgcolor=#d6d6d6
| 566918 ||  || — || November 9, 2007 || Kitt Peak || Spacewatch ||  || align=right | 2.5 km || 
|-id=919 bgcolor=#d6d6d6
| 566919 ||  || — || November 10, 2013 || Kitt Peak || Spacewatch ||  || align=right | 2.7 km || 
|-id=920 bgcolor=#E9E9E9
| 566920 ||  || — || September 11, 2004 || Kitt Peak || Spacewatch ||  || align=right | 1.5 km || 
|-id=921 bgcolor=#d6d6d6
| 566921 ||  || — || February 19, 2015 || Haleakala || Pan-STARRS ||  || align=right | 3.1 km || 
|-id=922 bgcolor=#d6d6d6
| 566922 ||  || — || October 11, 2007 || Catalina || CSS ||  || align=right | 2.5 km || 
|-id=923 bgcolor=#d6d6d6
| 566923 ||  || — || October 22, 2011 || Mount Lemmon || Mount Lemmon Survey || 7:4 || align=right | 3.4 km || 
|-id=924 bgcolor=#E9E9E9
| 566924 ||  || — || April 20, 2012 || Kitt Peak || Spacewatch ||  || align=right | 1.0 km || 
|-id=925 bgcolor=#d6d6d6
| 566925 ||  || — || October 16, 2007 || Mount Lemmon || Mount Lemmon Survey ||  || align=right | 2.5 km || 
|-id=926 bgcolor=#d6d6d6
| 566926 ||  || — || December 4, 2007 || Kitt Peak || Spacewatch ||  || align=right | 2.8 km || 
|-id=927 bgcolor=#d6d6d6
| 566927 ||  || — || October 23, 2012 || Mount Lemmon || Mount Lemmon Survey ||  || align=right | 2.4 km || 
|-id=928 bgcolor=#d6d6d6
| 566928 ||  || — || December 8, 2012 || Kitt Peak || Spacewatch || 7:4 || align=right | 2.9 km || 
|-id=929 bgcolor=#d6d6d6
| 566929 ||  || — || January 20, 2009 || Mount Lemmon || Mount Lemmon Survey ||  || align=right | 2.3 km || 
|-id=930 bgcolor=#d6d6d6
| 566930 ||  || — || September 10, 2007 || Kitt Peak || Spacewatch ||  || align=right | 2.4 km || 
|-id=931 bgcolor=#d6d6d6
| 566931 ||  || — || August 25, 2012 || Kitt Peak || Spacewatch ||  || align=right | 2.2 km || 
|-id=932 bgcolor=#E9E9E9
| 566932 ||  || — || June 7, 2013 || Mount Lemmon || Mount Lemmon Survey ||  || align=right | 1.4 km || 
|-id=933 bgcolor=#d6d6d6
| 566933 ||  || — || April 18, 2015 || Haleakala || Pan-STARRS || 7:4 || align=right | 3.7 km || 
|-id=934 bgcolor=#E9E9E9
| 566934 ||  || — || November 27, 2014 || Haleakala || Pan-STARRS ||  || align=right | 1.3 km || 
|-id=935 bgcolor=#d6d6d6
| 566935 ||  || — || August 6, 2012 || Haleakala || Pan-STARRS ||  || align=right | 2.6 km || 
|-id=936 bgcolor=#d6d6d6
| 566936 ||  || — || October 11, 2012 || Kitt Peak || Spacewatch ||  || align=right | 3.1 km || 
|-id=937 bgcolor=#d6d6d6
| 566937 ||  || — || September 18, 2001 || Apache Point || SDSS Collaboration ||  || align=right | 2.1 km || 
|-id=938 bgcolor=#d6d6d6
| 566938 ||  || — || October 17, 2007 || Mount Lemmon || Mount Lemmon Survey ||  || align=right | 2.5 km || 
|-id=939 bgcolor=#d6d6d6
| 566939 ||  || — || February 25, 2010 || La Palma || La Palma Obs. ||  || align=right | 2.5 km || 
|-id=940 bgcolor=#d6d6d6
| 566940 ||  || — || November 20, 2008 || Kitt Peak || Spacewatch ||  || align=right | 2.9 km || 
|-id=941 bgcolor=#d6d6d6
| 566941 ||  || — || November 20, 2008 || Kitt Peak || Spacewatch ||  || align=right | 2.2 km || 
|-id=942 bgcolor=#d6d6d6
| 566942 ||  || — || September 22, 2008 || Mount Lemmon || Mount Lemmon Survey ||  || align=right | 2.1 km || 
|-id=943 bgcolor=#d6d6d6
| 566943 ||  || — || December 10, 2013 || Mount Lemmon || Mount Lemmon Survey ||  || align=right | 2.9 km || 
|-id=944 bgcolor=#d6d6d6
| 566944 ||  || — || March 9, 2011 || Kitt Peak || Spacewatch ||  || align=right | 2.4 km || 
|-id=945 bgcolor=#E9E9E9
| 566945 ||  || — || January 7, 2006 || Mount Lemmon || Mount Lemmon Survey ||  || align=right | 1.6 km || 
|-id=946 bgcolor=#d6d6d6
| 566946 ||  || — || October 10, 2007 || Kitt Peak || Spacewatch ||  || align=right | 2.8 km || 
|-id=947 bgcolor=#d6d6d6
| 566947 ||  || — || October 8, 2007 || Mount Lemmon || Mount Lemmon Survey ||  || align=right | 2.1 km || 
|-id=948 bgcolor=#E9E9E9
| 566948 ||  || — || January 22, 2015 || Haleakala || Pan-STARRS ||  || align=right | 1.7 km || 
|-id=949 bgcolor=#d6d6d6
| 566949 ||  || — || December 5, 2007 || Mount Lemmon || Mount Lemmon Survey ||  || align=right | 2.5 km || 
|-id=950 bgcolor=#d6d6d6
| 566950 ||  || — || November 7, 2012 || Mount Lemmon || Mount Lemmon Survey || 7:4 || align=right | 2.4 km || 
|-id=951 bgcolor=#E9E9E9
| 566951 ||  || — || July 4, 2005 || Palomar || NEAT ||  || align=right data-sort-value="0.95" | 950 m || 
|-id=952 bgcolor=#d6d6d6
| 566952 ||  || — || December 2, 2008 || Kitt Peak || Spacewatch ||  || align=right | 2.6 km || 
|-id=953 bgcolor=#d6d6d6
| 566953 ||  || — || December 26, 2013 || Haleakala || Pan-STARRS ||  || align=right | 2.7 km || 
|-id=954 bgcolor=#E9E9E9
| 566954 ||  || — || April 15, 2007 || Kitt Peak || Spacewatch ||  || align=right | 2.8 km || 
|-id=955 bgcolor=#d6d6d6
| 566955 ||  || — || May 2, 2016 || Cerro Paranal || M. Altmann, T. Prusti ||  || align=right | 2.8 km || 
|-id=956 bgcolor=#d6d6d6
| 566956 ||  || — || February 16, 2015 || Haleakala || Pan-STARRS ||  || align=right | 2.4 km || 
|-id=957 bgcolor=#d6d6d6
| 566957 ||  || — || November 1, 2008 || Mount Lemmon || Mount Lemmon Survey ||  || align=right | 2.1 km || 
|-id=958 bgcolor=#d6d6d6
| 566958 ||  || — || June 9, 2016 || Cerro Tololo-LCO B || CTIO-LCO || 7:4 || align=right | 3.4 km || 
|-id=959 bgcolor=#d6d6d6
| 566959 ||  || — || January 21, 2015 || Haleakala || Pan-STARRS ||  || align=right | 2.5 km || 
|-id=960 bgcolor=#d6d6d6
| 566960 ||  || — || December 21, 2008 || Mount Lemmon || Mount Lemmon Survey ||  || align=right | 3.4 km || 
|-id=961 bgcolor=#E9E9E9
| 566961 ||  || — || October 2, 2013 || Haleakala || Pan-STARRS ||  || align=right | 2.1 km || 
|-id=962 bgcolor=#d6d6d6
| 566962 ||  || — || November 9, 2009 || Kitt Peak || Spacewatch ||  || align=right | 2.9 km || 
|-id=963 bgcolor=#E9E9E9
| 566963 ||  || — || January 10, 2011 || Mount Lemmon || Mount Lemmon Survey ||  || align=right | 2.2 km || 
|-id=964 bgcolor=#E9E9E9
| 566964 ||  || — || March 29, 2011 || Piszkesteto || Z. Kuli, K. Sárneczky ||  || align=right | 2.5 km || 
|-id=965 bgcolor=#d6d6d6
| 566965 ||  || — || October 9, 2008 || Catalina || CSS ||  || align=right | 2.9 km || 
|-id=966 bgcolor=#d6d6d6
| 566966 ||  || — || March 20, 2010 || Mount Lemmon || Mount Lemmon Survey ||  || align=right | 3.1 km || 
|-id=967 bgcolor=#d6d6d6
| 566967 ||  || — || January 31, 2009 || Mount Lemmon || Mount Lemmon Survey ||  || align=right | 2.7 km || 
|-id=968 bgcolor=#E9E9E9
| 566968 ||  || — || September 14, 2014 || Haleakala || Pan-STARRS ||  || align=right | 1.8 km || 
|-id=969 bgcolor=#E9E9E9
| 566969 ||  || — || January 11, 2011 || Kitt Peak || Spacewatch ||  || align=right | 2.9 km || 
|-id=970 bgcolor=#E9E9E9
| 566970 ||  || — || November 30, 2014 || Haleakala || Pan-STARRS ||  || align=right | 1.5 km || 
|-id=971 bgcolor=#d6d6d6
| 566971 ||  || — || October 16, 2012 || Mount Lemmon || Mount Lemmon Survey ||  || align=right | 2.4 km || 
|-id=972 bgcolor=#d6d6d6
| 566972 ||  || — || November 20, 2008 || Kitt Peak || Spacewatch ||  || align=right | 2.3 km || 
|-id=973 bgcolor=#E9E9E9
| 566973 ||  || — || August 29, 2013 || Haleakala || Pan-STARRS ||  || align=right | 2.2 km || 
|-id=974 bgcolor=#E9E9E9
| 566974 ||  || — || October 12, 2004 || Kitt Peak || Spacewatch ||  || align=right | 2.1 km || 
|-id=975 bgcolor=#E9E9E9
| 566975 ||  || — || June 6, 2013 || Mount Lemmon || Mount Lemmon Survey ||  || align=right data-sort-value="0.90" | 900 m || 
|-id=976 bgcolor=#E9E9E9
| 566976 ||  || — || July 27, 2009 || Kitt Peak || Spacewatch ||  || align=right | 1.6 km || 
|-id=977 bgcolor=#d6d6d6
| 566977 ||  || — || March 10, 2003 || Kitt Peak || Spacewatch ||  || align=right | 2.9 km || 
|-id=978 bgcolor=#d6d6d6
| 566978 ||  || — || January 25, 2009 || Kitt Peak || Spacewatch ||  || align=right | 2.4 km || 
|-id=979 bgcolor=#d6d6d6
| 566979 ||  || — || April 1, 2003 || Apache Point || SDSS Collaboration || Tj (2.98) || align=right | 3.0 km || 
|-id=980 bgcolor=#E9E9E9
| 566980 ||  || — || August 17, 2009 || Kitt Peak || Spacewatch ||  || align=right | 1.5 km || 
|-id=981 bgcolor=#d6d6d6
| 566981 ||  || — || June 25, 2017 || Haleakala || Pan-STARRS ||  || align=right | 2.3 km || 
|-id=982 bgcolor=#d6d6d6
| 566982 ||  || — || March 17, 2016 || Haleakala || Pan-STARRS ||  || align=right | 2.7 km || 
|-id=983 bgcolor=#fefefe
| 566983 ||  || — || October 24, 2011 || Haleakala || Pan-STARRS ||  || align=right data-sort-value="0.75" | 750 m || 
|-id=984 bgcolor=#d6d6d6
| 566984 ||  || — || November 15, 2007 || Mount Lemmon || Mount Lemmon Survey ||  || align=right | 2.7 km || 
|-id=985 bgcolor=#E9E9E9
| 566985 ||  || — || April 15, 2012 || Haleakala || Pan-STARRS ||  || align=right | 1.3 km || 
|-id=986 bgcolor=#d6d6d6
| 566986 ||  || — || October 31, 2013 || Piszkesteto || K. Sárneczky ||  || align=right | 2.5 km || 
|-id=987 bgcolor=#E9E9E9
| 566987 ||  || — || September 9, 2013 || Haleakala || Pan-STARRS ||  || align=right | 2.1 km || 
|-id=988 bgcolor=#d6d6d6
| 566988 ||  || — || November 2, 2013 || Mount Lemmon || Mount Lemmon Survey ||  || align=right | 2.4 km || 
|-id=989 bgcolor=#E9E9E9
| 566989 ||  || — || February 10, 2011 || Mount Lemmon || Mount Lemmon Survey ||  || align=right | 1.8 km || 
|-id=990 bgcolor=#E9E9E9
| 566990 ||  || — || October 13, 2006 || Kitt Peak || Spacewatch ||  || align=right data-sort-value="0.80" | 800 m || 
|-id=991 bgcolor=#d6d6d6
| 566991 ||  || — || September 21, 2003 || Kitt Peak || Spacewatch ||  || align=right | 2.1 km || 
|-id=992 bgcolor=#d6d6d6
| 566992 ||  || — || February 23, 2015 || Haleakala || Pan-STARRS ||  || align=right | 2.4 km || 
|-id=993 bgcolor=#d6d6d6
| 566993 ||  || — || August 16, 2001 || Palomar || NEAT ||  || align=right | 2.8 km || 
|-id=994 bgcolor=#E9E9E9
| 566994 ||  || — || November 20, 2009 || Kitt Peak || Spacewatch ||  || align=right | 1.9 km || 
|-id=995 bgcolor=#E9E9E9
| 566995 ||  || — || December 10, 2009 || Mount Lemmon || Mount Lemmon Survey ||  || align=right | 1.9 km || 
|-id=996 bgcolor=#E9E9E9
| 566996 ||  || — || September 14, 2013 || Haleakala || Pan-STARRS ||  || align=right | 2.0 km || 
|-id=997 bgcolor=#E9E9E9
| 566997 ||  || — || November 24, 2009 || Kitt Peak || Spacewatch ||  || align=right | 2.0 km || 
|-id=998 bgcolor=#d6d6d6
| 566998 ||  || — || November 3, 2007 || Kitt Peak || Spacewatch ||  || align=right | 2.4 km || 
|-id=999 bgcolor=#E9E9E9
| 566999 ||  || — || October 26, 2006 || Mauna Kea || Mauna Kea Obs. ||  || align=right data-sort-value="0.79" | 790 m || 
|-id=000 bgcolor=#E9E9E9
| 567000 ||  || — || August 14, 2013 || Haleakala || Pan-STARRS ||  || align=right | 2.1 km || 
|}

References

External links 
 Discovery Circumstances: Numbered Minor Planets (565001)–(570000) (IAU Minor Planet Center)

0566